= Renee Carroll =

American writer (1908–1985)

- Carroll in 1940s
- Born: Rebecca Shapiro; March 6, 1908; New York City, U.S.
- Died: May 1985 (aged 77); Mallorca, Spain
- Occupations: Hatchecker, writer, actress

Renee Carroll (born Rebecca Shapiro; March 6, 1908 – May 1985) was an American hatcheck girl, writer, and occasional actress associated with the Theater District, Manhattan. She worked for over two decades at Sardi's restaurant in Manhattan, where she became a fixture in the community, authored a memoir, and supported theater productions and emerging actors.

== Early life ==
Renee Carroll was born Rebecca Shapiro on March 6, 1908, on Manhattan's Lower East Side. Her parents, Herman Shapiro, an Orthodox rabbi, and Gertrude Frances Nathan, raised her alongside her siblings, Anna and Solomon Reuben Shapiro. She attended public school until the age of 15 before leaving formal education.

Although her parents wished for her to pursue law, Carroll chose to take business classes and briefly worked in a law office. Dissatisfied with the work, she turned to dancing and found employment as a taxi dancer at the Roseland Ballroom, earning small fees for partnering with patrons. Carroll’s rebellious nature led to tensions with her father, resulting in her being locked out of the family home. She adopted her pseudonym, Renee Carroll, inspired by a fictional character, and fabricated a backstory to obscure her origins.

== Career ==
Carroll began working at Sardi's, a restaurant in Theater District, Manhattan, in 1927, within days of her 19th birthday. The venue, known for its association with Broadway luminaries, became the platform for Carroll to cultivate her career and persona. Her exceptional memory for names, faces, and even hats made her a notable figure among the patrons.

Carroll's wit and informal critiques of plays left in her care gained her a reputation among playwrights and producers. Her opinions were valued enough that patrons tipped her for luck, even when not leaving hats. Playwright Eugene O’Neill once entrusted her with his wristwatch, highlighting her trustworthiness.

Beyond her work at Sardi's, Carroll explored acting, writing, and editing. She made stage appearances, such as in the 1929 play Buckaroo and the 1944 revue Bright Lights, though these ventures met with limited success. Her 1933 memoir, In Your Hat, compiled her candid observations on Broadway’s personalities. Illustrated by Alex Gard, the book received mixed reviews but showcased her ability to blend humor and insight.

Carroll also leveraged her connections to help emerging actors and secure funding for plays she admired. She encouraged Humphrey Bogart, then an uncertain young actor, to consider a career in film.

In 1951, Carroll left her position at Sardi’s to work alongside her husband in his Broadway ticket business.

== Personal life ==
In 1950, Carroll married Louis Schonceit, a Broadway ticket broker whose contentious divorce from his previous wife had made headlines. The couple settled into a quieter life, eventually retiring to Mallorca, Spain. They announced plans to co-write a memoir, 44 Years on 44th Street, chronicling their experiences in the theater world, though the book's publication status remains unknown.

Carroll maintained ties to the Broadway community throughout her life. She died in May 1985 in Mallorca at the age of 77.
