= Vincent Sardi =

Vincent Sardi may refer to:

- Vincent Sardi Sr. (1885–1969), American restaurateur
- Vincent Sardi Jr. (1915–2007), American restaurateur
