= Joel's Bohemia =

Restaurant in New York City, 1902–1925

Coordinates: 40.7557603°N 73.9885315°W

- Interactive map of Joel's Bohemia

Restaurant information
- Previous owner: Joel Rinaldo
- Location: New York City, New York

Joel's Bohemia was a two-story all-night restaurant near Times Square, New York from 1902 to 1925, catering to artists, writers, revolutionaries, and other bohemians. Owned by and managed by Joel Rinaldo, it was also known as Joel's or Joel's Bohemian Refreshery. Above the restaurant, Rinaldo ran a three-story hotel. Its address was 206 West 41st Street.

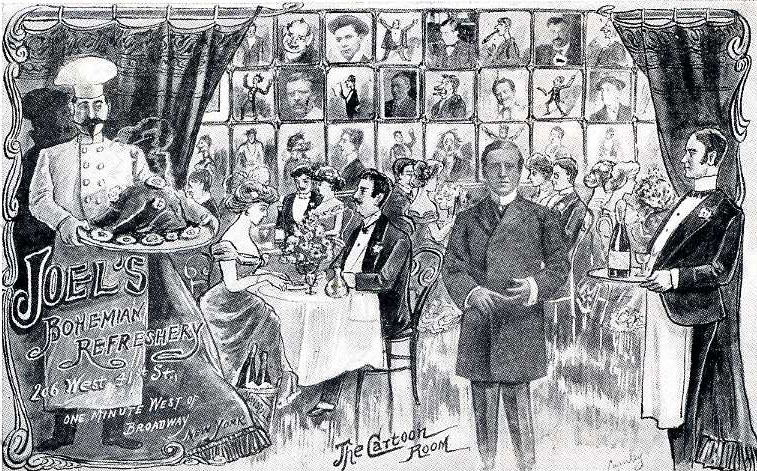
"Cartoon Room" (postcard)

Joel's claimed to be the only place in New York offering Mexican food, with specialties of chile con carne and tamales. His Blue Moon cocktail was notoriously strong. Joel's was once described as a "poor man's Rector's". There was usually piano music, singing, and often an impromptu cabaret show.

Among the regulars were Booth Tarkington, Horace Traubel, William Glackens, George Luks, Alan Dale, William Winter, Zoe Anderson Norris, Shaemas O'Sheel, Sadakichi Hartmann, Robert Chanler, Hippolyte Havel, "General" Jake Coxey, and O. Henry. The El Refugio café in O. Henry's 1910 short story "The Gold that Glittered" was probably based on Joel's. When he was in town, Edwin Markham would drink coffee at the restaurant and sleep at the hotel.

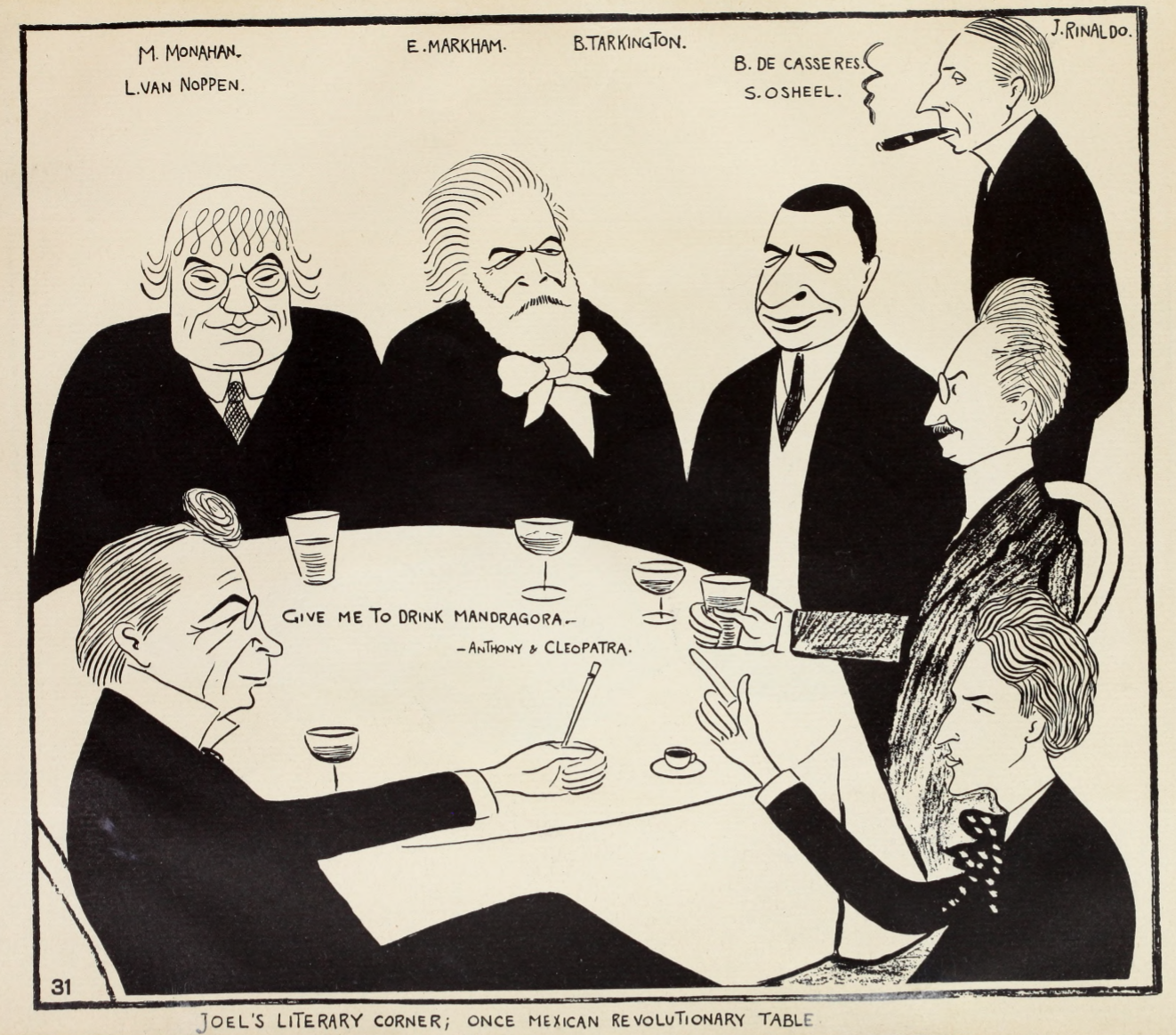
Carlo de Fornaro, "The Literature and Revolution Table", c1911

Joel's was a "renowned" meeting place for Spanish-language exiles, especially "bohemians, painters, musicians, caricaturists, actors". A table in the corner of the dining-room had a sign on it, starting at 11 o'clock, reading "Reserved for Literature and Revolution", "where famous Hispanic-American revolutionaries used to sit". Leaders of the Mexican Carrancistas met here, and the Mexican Liberal Party's headquarters were here. When the US joined the First World War in 1917, the table was renamed the "Newspaper and Literary Table".

[H]is Bohemia was... the meeting-place of heretics and radicals of all breeds: fleeing, out-at-heels generals from Mexico; hunted, unshaven admirals from Honduras; common, every-day White House dynamiters from Guatemala; bawling Egyptian Anarchists; loud-mouthed sappers and minors of the social edifice in general who would shup up for a beer and a load of beans; barroom Napoleons and millennial crackpots of all nationalities.

— — Benjamin De Casseres

Several artists painted scenes set in the restaurant:

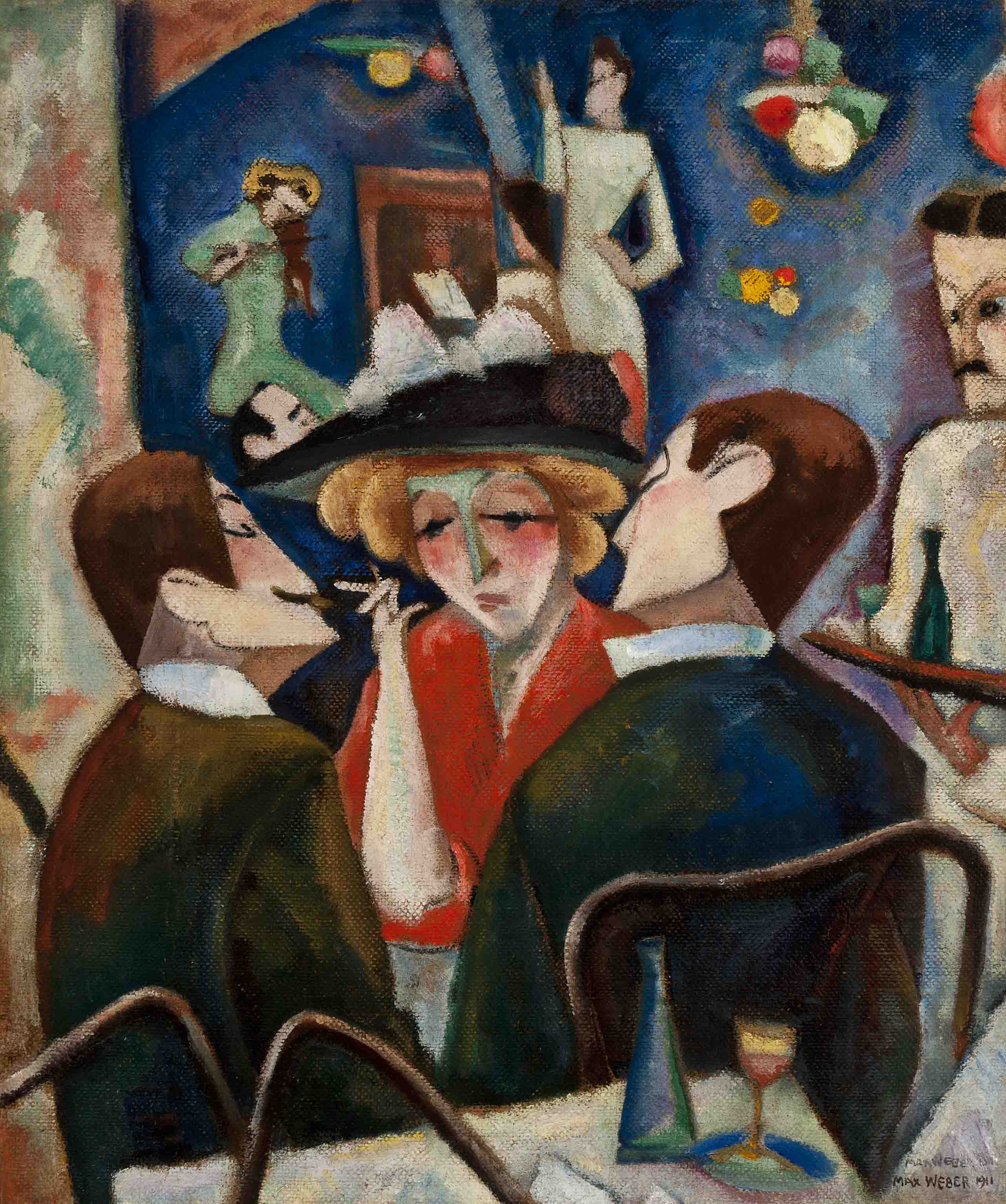
Max Weber, "Joel's Café"

- Max Weber's oil painting "Joel's Cafe", 1909 or 1910.
- George Luks, "Joel's Famous Bohemia at 41st Street and Seventh Avenue. The Tall Man is Joel", published in Vanity Fair in 1934.

Joel's was famous for its celebrity wall of drawings and caricatures, some by Carlo de Fornaro, an opponent of Porfirio Díaz. Paintings by Luks, Glackens, and John Sloan hung on the walls.

The closing of Joel's in 1925 was memorialized in the New Yorker:

Joel's has closed; perhaps the last of the older order of restaurants, whose hosts were individuals, not corporations. It was never a gaudy, nor a gilt-edged establishment, that one on Forty-first street, with its green-tinted door; and its heydays were ten, or even fifteen years behind when it surrendered to the inevitable.
