= Wall of fame (disambiguation) =

A wall of fame is a wall containing plaques commemorating notable individuals.

Wall of fame may also refer to:

- Celebrity wall, a wall on a restaurant or bar containing photos or caricatures, also known as a wall of fame
- Wall of Fame (game show), a short-lived 2011 British comedy panel show
- "Wall of Fame" (Back to You), a 2008 episode of the American TV sitcom Back to You
