= List of Libyan Arabic words of Italian origin =

Italian loanwords exist in Libyan Arabic mainly, but not exclusively, as a technical jargon. For example, machinery parts, workshop tools, electrical supplies, names of fish species ...etc.

Italian Loanwords
Libyan Arabic				Italian	
Words	IPA (Western)	IPA (Eastern)	Meaning	Word	Meaning
ṣālīṭa	[sˤɑːliːtˤa]		slope	salita	up slope
kinšēllu	[kənʃeːlːu]		metallic gate	cancello	gate
anguli	[aŋɡuli]		corner	angolo	corner
ṭānṭa, uṭānṭa	[tˤɑːntˤɑ], [utˤɑːntˤɑ]		truck	ottanta	eighty (a model of a truck of Italian make)
tēsta	[teːsta]		a hit with the forehead	testa	head
maršabēdi	[marʃabeːdi]		sidewalk	marciapiede	sidewalk
calcio	[kɑːttʃu]		kick	calcio	kick
sbageṭi, spageṭi	[sbɑːɡeːtˤi, spɑːɡeːtˤi]			spaghetti	
lazānya	[lɑːzɑːnja]			lasagna	
rizoṭu	[rizoːtˤu]			risotto	
feṭuččini	[fetˤutˤ.ʃiːni]			fettuccine	
kuğīna	[ku.dʒiːna]		kitchen	cucina	
bagno	[banyu]		bathroom	bagno	
lavandino	[lavandino]		sink	lavandino	
rifugio	[rifugio]		refuge	rifugio	
garage	[garage]		garage	garage	
carrozza	[carrozza]		carriage	carrozza	
macchina	[machine]		machine	macchina	
fattura	[fattura]		invoice, bill	fattura	
bolletta	[bolletta]		bill, ticket	bolletta	
ospedale	[ospedale]		hospital	ospedale	
cassa	[cassa]		box, money	cassa	
bicicletta	[bicicletta]		bike, bicycle	bicicletta	
medaglia	[medaglia]		medal	medaglia	
gomma	[gomma]		rubber, tire	gomma	
penna	[penna]		pen	penna	
lista	[lista]		list	lista	
tabella	[tabella]		poster, signboard, table	tabella	
semaforo	[semaforo]		trafficlight	semaforo	
marciapiede	[marciapiede]		sidewalk, pavement	marciapiede	
bosco	[bosco]		woodland, forest	bosco	
camicia	[camicia]		shirt	camicia	
calzature	[calzature]		footwear, cover leg for footballer	calzature	
forchetta	[forchetta]		fork	forchetta	
antenna	[antenna]		antenna	antenna	
gonna	[gonna]		skirt	gonna	
puttana	[puttana]		whore	puttana	
balcone	[balcone]		balcony	balcone	
borsa	[borsa]		bag	borsa	
parcheggio	[parcheggio]		parking	parcheggio	
sacco	[sacco]		bag, hand bag, luggage, baggage	sacco	
scala	[scala]		ladder	scala	
mazza	[mazza]		bat, club, mace, sledge-hammer, mallet	mazza	
freno	[freno]		brake	freno	
freno a mano	[freno a mano]		handbrake	freno a mano	
trapano	[trapano]		drill	trapano	
cacciavite	[cacciavite]		screwdriver	cacciavite	
chiave inglese	[chiave inglese]		wrench	chiave inglese	
pinze	[pinze]		pliers	pinze	
tazza	[tazza]		cup, glass water	tazza	
vaso	[tazza]		jar	vaso	
aspetta	[aspetta]		wait	aspetta	
televisione	[televisione]		television	televisione	
musica	[musica]		music	musica	
radio	[radio]		radio	radio	
porta	[porta]		goal	porta	
calcio di rigore	[calcio di rigore]		calcio di rigore	porta	
scoglio	[scoglio]		rock, cliff	porta	
pagabondo	[pagabondo]		vagabond, homeless	pagabondo	
bastardo	[bastardo]		bastard	bastardo	
canottiera	[canottiera]		undershirt, vest	canottiera	
maglietta	[maglietta]		t shirt	maglietta	
mutande	[mutande]		underwear	mutande	
scaffale	[scaffale]		shelf, rack, bookcase	scaffale	
giacca	[giacca]		jacket	giacca	
giubbotto	[giubbotto]		jacket	giubbotto	
benzene	[benzene]		benzine	benzene	
lavaggio	[lavaggio]		car wash station, wash	lavaggio	
vetrina	[vetrina]		showcase	vetrina	
finito	[finito]		finished, gone	finito	
trattore	[trattore]		tractor	trattore	
camino	[camino]		fireplace	camino	
stufa	[stufa]		stove	stufa	
pioggia	[pioggia]		rain	pioggia	
veranda	[veranda]		balcony, veranda	veranda	
tuta	[tuta]		suit	tuta	
dumper	[dumper]		dumper truck	dumper	
cappuccio	[cappuccio]		hood (cloths)	cappuccio	
cofano	[cofano]		engine cover	cofano	
gusto	[gusto]		taste, flavor, fancy	gusto	
giardino	[giardino]		guardian	giardino	
frutta	[frutta]		fruit, fruit mix	frutta	
testa	[testa]		head	testa	
cambio	[cambio]		gear	cambio	
macete	[macete]		machete, knife	cambio	
pala	[pala]		shovel	pala	
guanti	[guanti]		gloves	guanti	
viaggio	[viaggio]		trip, journey	viaggio	
occasione	[viaggio]		opportunity, chance, bargain	occasione	
senza	[senza]		without, nothing	senza	
sigaro	[sigaro]		cigar, cigarette	sigaro	
lampada	[lampada]		lamp, bulb	lampada	
rete	[rete]		net	rete	
tiro	[tiro]		shot	tiro	
d'effetto	[d'effetto]		reflection, reflex, effect, reflexion, influence	d'effetto	
tacco	[tacco]		heel	tacco	
palo	[palo]		post (upright; vertical post)	palo	
fallo	[fallo]		foul	fallo	
tuffo	[tuffo]		dive	tuffo	
rimessa laterale	[rimessa laterale]		throw-in	rimessa laterale	
punta	[punta]		striker in football	punta	
il libero	[il libero]		central defender	il libero	
giro	[giro]		tour, ride, round	giro	
affari	[affari]		business	affari	
