= Florence Anderson Clark =

American journalist (1835–1918)

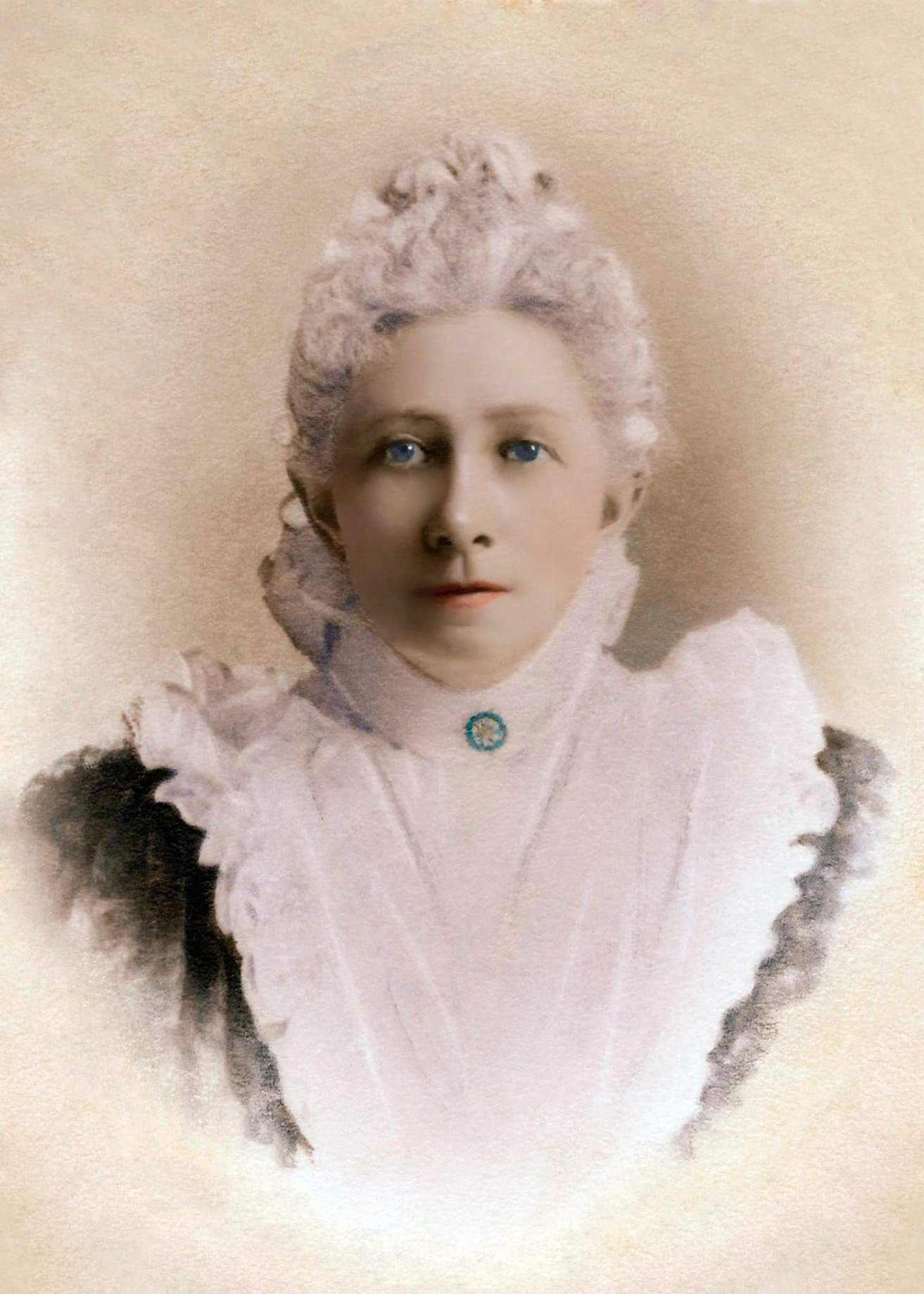
- Born: Florence Anderson; June 10, 1835; Virginia, U.S.
- Died: March 19, 1918 (aged 82)
- Resting place: Oakwood Cemetery, Austin, Texas, U.S.
- Occupations: author; newspaper editor; librarian; university administrator
- Spouse: James Benjamin Clark (m. 1869)
- Children: 2
- Relatives: Zoe Anderson Norris (cousin); Edmund Kirby Smith
- Writing career
- Language: English

Florence Anderson Clark (née Anderson; June 10, 1835 – March 19, 1918) was an American author, newspaper editor, librarian, and university administrator. She served for 14 years as assistant librarian at the University of Texas (UT), and in honor for her service to the university, she was first woman to have her portrait hung in the university's Main Tower. Clark was affiliated with several organizations, including the Daughters of the American Revolution (D.A.R), Colonial Dames of America, and United Daughters of the Confederacy.

== Early life and education ==
Florence Anderson was born in Virginia, June 10, 1835. She was descended from colonial patriots. Her parents were John B. Anderson, a Virginian, and Elizabeth Ann Smith Anderson, of Baltimore, Maryland. Clark's three siblings were Ada, Ellen, and Henry. One of John Anderson's brothers, Henry Tompkins Anderson (1812–1872), was the father of writer Zoe Anderson Norris, and another brother, Robert T. Anderson, ran an innovative school for deaf children in Hopkinsville, KY, in the 1840s and '50s.

Clark's great-grandmother, Thankful Hubbard, was a Mayflower Puritan, and one of the women who aided in the struggle for the country's liberty. Clark was the granddaughter of Capt. Joseph Smith of Baltimore, Maryland, who served in the Maryland and Virginia line during the American Revolutionary War. He was the younger brother of Major Elnathan Smith of Connecticut (the grandfather of Gen. Edmund Kirby Smith, C.S.A.). Captain Smith was the son of Joseph Smith of Farmington, Connecticut and Thankful Hubbard, his wife, a mother of patriots, who had four soldier sons; Gideon, killed in the French and Indian War; Gordon, a soldier of the Revolution, also killed; Elnathan and Joseph Jr. Mrs. Thankful Hubbard Smith was the daughter of George Hubbard of Middleton, Connecticut (1680), granddaughter of Samuel Hubbard (1648) and Sarah Kirby his wife and great-great-granddaughter of George Hubbard, who came from Massachusetts to Hartford, Connecticut in 1639, and his wife, Elizabeth Watts of Hartford.

At a young age, the family removed to Kentucky. She was educated by her father, who served as a teacher at a boys' college in Paris, Kentucky. Before the age of twelve, she had read Virgil and Horace.

== Career ==
=== Kentucky ===
Clark became a teacher at the same Paris, Kentucky boys' college where her father worked.

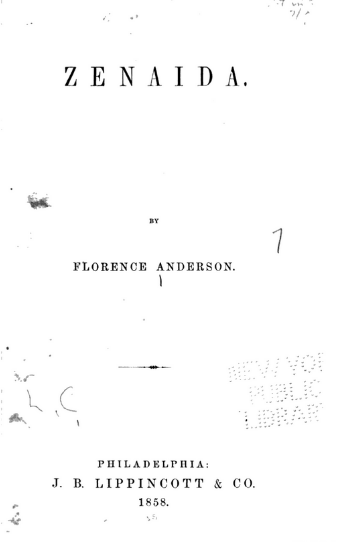
Frontispiece, Zenaida (1858)

Her first writings were prose; and her first book, Zenaida, a Romance (Lippincott & Co., Philadelphia, 1859) was published when she was a resident of Paris, Kentucky. In Zenaida, the frequent, familiar allusions to classic subjects, and the use of words of classic derivation in preference to the more rugged and vigorous Saxon, were noted as defects in her style by more than one critic. The book was written as a contribution to a small paper, edited by a sister and herself to enliven the winter evenings, in a quiet country home. Read aloud by that sister's voice, the imperfections of Zenaida were overlooked by the sisters, and the book was published before Anderson had had time to edit it. Its flattering reception by an indulgent public would, doubtless, have stimulated the Anderson to continue writing in the field of romance, had not the Civil War absorbed her sympathies, and paled the desire to write.

Her first poems were published in 1858 and 1859. During the civil war, some of her poems were published in the South, and in London. At that time, the Confederate prisoners at Johnson's Island and other prisons claimed the sympathies of Kentucky women. Anderson was asked to write pieces to cheer the lonely prisoners, who were weary and homesick. Anderson also sent a flannel suit to Johnson's Island along with a card with her name on it. It was a received by Capt. James Benjamin Clark, and thereafter, they wrote to each other for the remaining 19 months that he was imprisoned.

After the civil war, her poem, "Blind Tom's Music", was published in The Cincinnati Enquirer, July, 1865. She also contributed to Southland Writers, and other collections, published in New York City. Capt. Clark joined her at Harrodsburg, Kentucky where they served as co-editors of The Kentucky People, and in 1869, they married. They had two children, a daughter, Edith Lanier Clark, and a son, Carroll S. Clark. Mrs. Clark's contributions, both prose and poetry, were a marked feature of the paper and she also published a novel. According to Raymond (Southland Writers: Biographical and Critical Sketches of the Living Female Writers of the South; with Extracts from Their Writings, 1870):—

In Anderson’s ideal of true development, the artist is ever subordinate to the woman, the woman to the Christian. She turns from the profound speculations and beautiful theories of philosophers and sages with more confiding faith in Christ, recognizing Him as the Saviour of all mankind, but preeminently the Friend of woman. Believing as she does that the aim of life should be rather to make the whole life a poem, divine in its beautiful harmony, than to write poetry, her poems are to be judged more as the spontaneous expression of an emotional condition of the mind than as the labored effort of her muse. She has sung as the birds sing, because the song in her heart demanded a voice.

=== Texas ===
After the Clarks removed to Texas, they lived in Bonham, for six years. During that time, in the years 1883–85, the husband (known as "Judge Clark" because of his legal training) became a Regent of the UT.

The poem, "Shakespeare", written by Clark dedicated to William Preston Johnston, president of Tulane University, New Orleans, was written while she attended the World Cotton Centennial in that city, and it was read by her at the celebration of Chautauqua memorial day, to commemorate the birthday of William Shakespeare, April 23, 1885, in the music hall of the World's exposition.

In 1886, they removed to Austin where Judge Clark served as the university's first proctor, the included the responsibilities including auditor, campus caretaker, comptroller, faculty secretary, librarian, and registrar, and business manager. He served in this role for 25 years till his death in 1908. For fourteen years, Mrs. Clark served as the university's assistant librarian.

In Austin, Clark was the founder of the Thankful Hubbard chapter of the DAR, which was named in honor of her ancestor, Thankful Hubbard. In 1889, Clark became the first State Regent of the Texas Society of the D.A.R. The National society of the D.A.R. so appreciated the pioneer work which Clark did for the order in Texas that she was made honorary State regent for life. She also served as historian of the Thankful Hubbard Chapter.

Clark was a charter member of the Colonial Dames in Texas, and a member of the United Daughters of the Confederacy. She was one of the organizers and a member of the University Ladies' Club, as well as of the Shakespeare Club.

== Death and legacy ==
Clark died March 19, 1918, and was buried in Austin's Oakwood Cemetery.

In 1921, the Florence Anderson Clark D.A.R. memorial scholarship was adopted by the University of Texas. At the same time, US$500 was appropriated by the D.A.R. for a memorial to be placed in the university in Clark's honor.

In 1925, Clark's portrait, painted by Kaherine Carothers, was presented to the university on behalf of the Texas state DAR.

== Publications ==
- Zenaida, a Romance (Lippincott & Co., 1858)
