= Mack David =

American composer (1912–1993)

- Born: July 5, 1912; New York City, U.S.
- Died: December 30, 1993 (aged 81) Rancho Mirage, California, U.S.
- Genre: Pop
- Occupations: Lyricist; songwriter

Mack David (July 5, 1912 – December 30, 1993) was an American lyricist and songwriter, notable for his work in film and television, with a career spanning the period between the early 1940s and the early 1970s. David was credited with writing lyrics or music or both for over one thousand songs. He was particularly well known for his work on the Disney films Cinderella and Alice in Wonderland, and for the mostly-English lyrics through which Édith Piaf's signature song "La Vie en rose" gained much of its familiarity among native speakers of English.

David was the elder brother of American lyricist and songwriter Hal David.

== Life and career ==
David was born on July 5, 1912, in New York City to a Jewish family. David originally planned to become an attorney and attended Cornell University and St. John's University Law School. Despite these original goals, in the mid-1940s, David began writing songs for New York's Tin Pan Alley. These initial successes prompted David to move to Hollywood, California, to work in the film and television industries.

He enjoyed considerable success, including eight Academy Award nominations—for "Bibbidi-Bobbidi-Boo", which he, Al Hoffman and Jerry Livingston wrote for Walt Disney's Cinderella (1950), followed by the title songs from The Hanging Tree (1959), Bachelor in Paradise (1961), Walk on the Wild Side (1962), It's a Mad, Mad, Mad, Mad World (1963), Hush...Hush, Sweet Charlotte (1964), "The Ballad of Cat Ballou" from Cat Ballou (1965) and "My Wishing Doll" from Hawaii (1966). David was inducted into the Songwriters Hall of Fame in 1975. David's "most remunerative" song, "Sunflower", was published in 1948, and Frank Sinatra turned it into a hit. Jerry Herman's hit theme song for Hello, Dolly! composed over a decade later, used four bars of David's "Sunflower". When David sued Herman for copyright infringement, Herman settled out of court with David (for a reputed $250,000), claiming he had never heard David's "Sunflower" prior to working on "Hello, Dolly!"

== Academy Award nominations ==
- 1950 "Bibbidi-Bobbidi-Boo" (with Jerry Livingston and Al Hoffman) from Cinderella
- 1959 "The Hanging Tree" (with Jerry Livingston) from The Hanging Tree
- 1961 "Bachelor in Paradise" (with Henry Mancini) from Bachelor in Paradise
- 1962 "Walk on the Wild Side" (with Elmer Bernstein) from Walk on the Wild Side
- 1963 "It's a Mad, Mad, Mad, Mad World" (with Ernest Gold) from It's a Mad, Mad, Mad, Mad World
- 1964 "Hush, Hush, Sweet Charlotte" (with Frank De Vol) from Hush...Hush, Sweet Charlotte
- 1965 "The Ballad of Cat Ballou" (with Jerry Livingston) from Cat Ballou
- 1966 "My Wishing Doll" (with Elmer Bernstein) from Hawaii

== Composer and lyricist of popular songs ==
In addition to his many Academy Award nominations, David also had a number of hit songs, including:

- "Rain, Rain, Go Away" (1932)
- Duke Ellington's "I'm Just a Lucky So-and-So" (1939)
- "I Don't Care If The Sun Don't Shine", sung by Patti Page in 1950 (with subsequent cover versions), later covered by Elvis Presley as a rockabilly-styled tune in 1954
- "The Unbirthday Song" (with Jerry Livingston and Al Hoffman) from Alice in Wonderland (1951)
- The Shirelles' "Baby It's You" (1961 with Burt Bacharach and Luther Dixon (credited as Barney Williams))
- "(Beware of) The Blob" (a charted hit by The 5 Blobs; film theme song to 1958 camp-horror classic The Blob, starring Steve McQueen, with Burt Bacharach
- "It Must Be Him" (1967 with Gilbert Becaud)
- Theme song to Casper the Friendly Ghost (1950 with Jerry Livingston)
- "Trick or Treat for Halloween" (with Jerry Livingston and Al Hoffman) from Trick or Treat (1952)

David collaborated with many composers, including Raymond Scott, Al Hoffman, Alex Kramer, Count Basie, Burt Bacharach, Henry Mancini, and Jerry Livingston, on numerous songs for stage and screen, including Casper the Friendly Ghost, 77 Sunset Strip, Hawaiian Eye, Bourbon Street Beat, Surfside 6 and "This Is It" (for the 1960s The Bugs Bunny Show).

Perhaps David's most popular lyrics were written for "La Vie en rose", a French song with lyrics by Édith Piaf and music by Louiguy (Louis Guglielmi), which was Piaf's signature song. Although David did not write an English translation of Piaf's lyrics, his words captured the spirit of the song; his version was performed by artists such as Louis Armstrong. The song was recorded by over eighty international singers and musicians and been featured in several dozen motion pictures.

David's song "Candy" (co-written with Whitney and Kramer) was recorded by Ella Fitzgerald for her 1968 album 30 by Ella.

== Work on Broadway ==
- Bright Lights of 1944 (1943) – revue – lyricist
- Gilbert Bécaud on Broadway (1966) – concert – featured lyricist
- Molly (1973) – musical – co-lyricist
- Sophisticated Ladies (1981) – revue – featured songwriter for "I'm Just a Lucky So-and-So"
- Swing! (1999) – revue – featured songwriter for "Candy"

== Inventor ==
David had a varied interest in musical composition. In 1975, according to the New York Times in David's obituary: "Mr. David was granted a patent for inventing an electronic system for composing songs from fractional recordings. The system, which included playback units, stored records of lyrics and melodies. The operator selected words and music that fit together and recorded the combination."
