= Joe Zelli =

Nightclub owner in Paris and New York

Joe Zelli (Rome, 1889 – Copake, New York, 1971) was an American club owner who ran celebrated nightclubs in Paris, France, and New York City from the 1910s to the 1930s.

His most famous club was The Royal Box, at 16bis rue Fontaine, Paris, which opened in 1922 and closed in 1932. It had a balcony with an American bar and "royal boxes".

The Royal Box is considered the first ever nightclub in the world, with opening hours from midnight until dawn. It was the nocturnal home to many members of the Lost Generation, expatriates who flocked to Paris after the First World War. Notable clients included Ernest Hemingway, Cole Porter, Buster Keaton, and Louise Brooks.

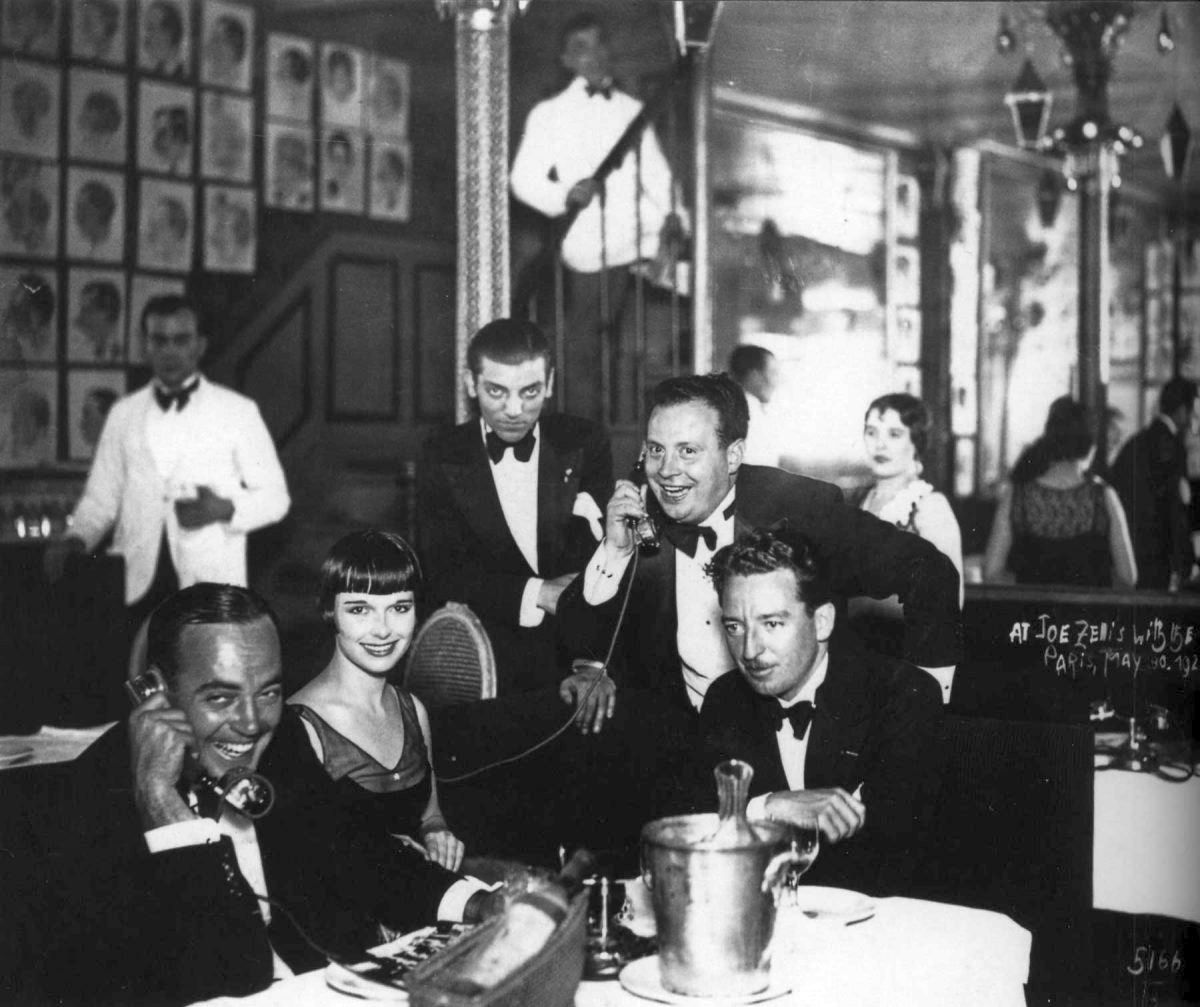
Zelli, Louise Brooks, and others at The Royal Box.

The club had the most prominent jazz orchestra in Paris at the time and included Sidney Bechet and Eugene Bullard as bandleader. Bullard was a war hero who was the first African-American fighter pilot, flying for France in World War I.

The filmmaker David McDonald stumbled upon Joe Zelli's grave while on a walk during the height of the pandemic in 2021. Feeling that Zelli was reaching out to him from beyond the grave, McDonald commenced a film entitled My Encounter With The Ghost Of Joe Zelli, which debuted in 2024.

Zelli returned to the U.S. and later owned other clubs, but none as successful as The Royal Box.

A caricaturist named Zito drew guests to the nightclub over a period of four years, making a celebrity wall downstairs. This is said to be the inspiration for the caricatures at Sardi's restaurant in New York.
