= Alfredo alla Scrofa =

Restaurant in Rome, Italy

Coordinates: 41°54′8.2″N 12°28′29.3″E

- Interactive map of Alfredo alla Scrofa

Restaurant information
- Established: 1914; 112 years ago
- Food type: Italian cuisine
- Location: Via della Scrofa, 104/a, 00186, Rome, Italy
- Website: www.alfredoallascrofa.com

Alfredo alla Scrofa is an Italian restaurant in Rome, Italy, which opened in 1914 and is known as the birthplace of fettuccine Alfredo.

== History ==
Alfredo Di Lelio, the founder of Ristirante Alfredo, claimed to have created fettuccine Alfredo. According to family accounts, in 1892 he began to work in a restaurant that was located in piazza Rosa run by his mother Angelina. In 1914, he converted an oil and wine shop into a restaurant, initially called "Alfredo", on the Via della Scrofa, in central Rome.

Di Lelio invented fettuccine al triplo burro (later named "fettuccine all'Alfredo" or "fettuccine Alfredo") in 1908 in piazza Rosa, while running his oil and wine shop, in an effort to entice his wife, Ines, to eat after giving birth to their first child Armando. Di Lelio added extra butter or triplo burro to the fettuccine when mixing it together for his wife. In 1920, two famous American actors, Douglas Fairbanks and Mary Pickford, ate at Alfredo alla Scrofa while on their honeymoon. The couple ordered fettuccine al triplo burro, asked for the recipe, and brought it to the U.S.

In 1943, Di Lelio sold his restaurant to a new owner (Alfredo alla Scrofa), and in 1950, he opened another restaurant with his son Armando in Piazza Augusto Imperatore, Il Vero Alfredo (lit. 'The Real Alfredo'), that is still in business and is managed by Di Lelio's grandchildren.

Both restaurants are known for their celebrity walls.

In 1977, Di Lelio and a partner opened another Alfredo's near Rockefeller Center in New York City as well as a third Alfredo's in Epcot at Disney World. The Epcot restaurant closed in 2017, and the New York one is closed as of 2023. The restaurants served "Original Alfredo sauce".
