= The Palm (restaurant) =

- Interactive map of The Palm

Restaurant information
- Established: 1926; 100 years ago
- Owner: Landry's, Inc.
- Food type: Steakhouse
- Location: 837 Second Avenue (between East 44th Street and East 45th Street) in Manhattan, New York City, New York
- Coordinates: 40°45′06″N 73°58′16″W
- Other locations: United States (various), Mexico City
- Website: www.thepalm.com

The Palm is an international chain of American fine-dining steakhouses that began in 1926. The original location was in New York City at 837 Second Avenue (between East 44th Street and East 45th Street) in Manhattan.

Since its beginnings, management has opened additional restaurants throughout the United States, Puerto Rico, and Mexico. The Palm is notable for steak, lobster, traditional Italian dishes, and the caricatures of celebrities on its walls.

== History ==
Italian immigrants Pio Bozzi and John Ganzi opened the first Palm restaurant in 1926. It was originally intended to be named La Parma, but a city licensing clerk misunderstood the thick Italian accent of the founders. The owners found it was easier to change the name than to get the license reissued.

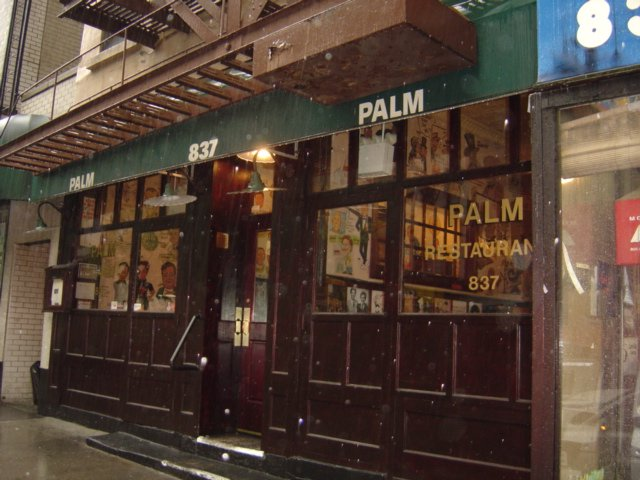
Outside view of the original Palm.

The Palm served as a luncheon and dinner club for members of the city's newspapers for many years. The New York Daily Mirror and King Features (cartoon syndicated) were located on 45th Street between Second and Third Avenues; the Daily News, United Press (later United Press International) and United Features (cartoon syndicate) were located in the Daily News Building on 42nd Street and Second Avenue. The Herald Tribune was on 41st Street and Third Avenue and the World Telegram was on 49th Street and Third Avenue. The proximity of the cartoon syndicates led to the colorful caricatures on the walls. The original Palm consisted of one room at 837 Second Avenue, then it expanded to the second room and eventually to the second floor before opening across the street.

=== Cuisine ===
When the Palm opened, it operated as a conventional Italian restaurant offering fare similar to that found in New York's Little Italy neighborhood. Early in its history, however, Bozzi and Ganzi fielded a request for steak and the owners broiled it after retrieving meat from a Second Avenue butcher. As related in the Palm cook book, the first request led to others and the items were put on the menu.

Later, the Palm added Nova Scotia lobsters and aged USDA Prime beef, often served bone-in, as well as a selection of salads.

It opened a restaurant in London employing Jason Wallis as executive head chef in 2009. It has since closed. It was opened on the site of Drones, a former Marco Pierre White restaurant.

=== Caricatures ===
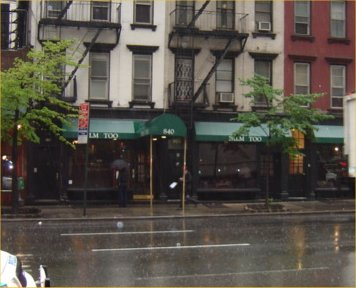
The Palm Too on 2nd Avenue, New York

A defining feature of the restaurant's brand has been the celebrity walls of caricatures drawn directly on the walls. Those depicted include celebrities, politicians, and sports and media figures.

The Palm's historical materials contend that the caricature tradition began as a twist on the phrase "sing for your meal" where an artist who enjoyed the fare would pay for his meal by drawing a portrait on the wall. Featured celebrities have often provided an autograph next to their portrait.

Later, as the brand expanded, this tradition continued at other locations.

=== Expansion ===
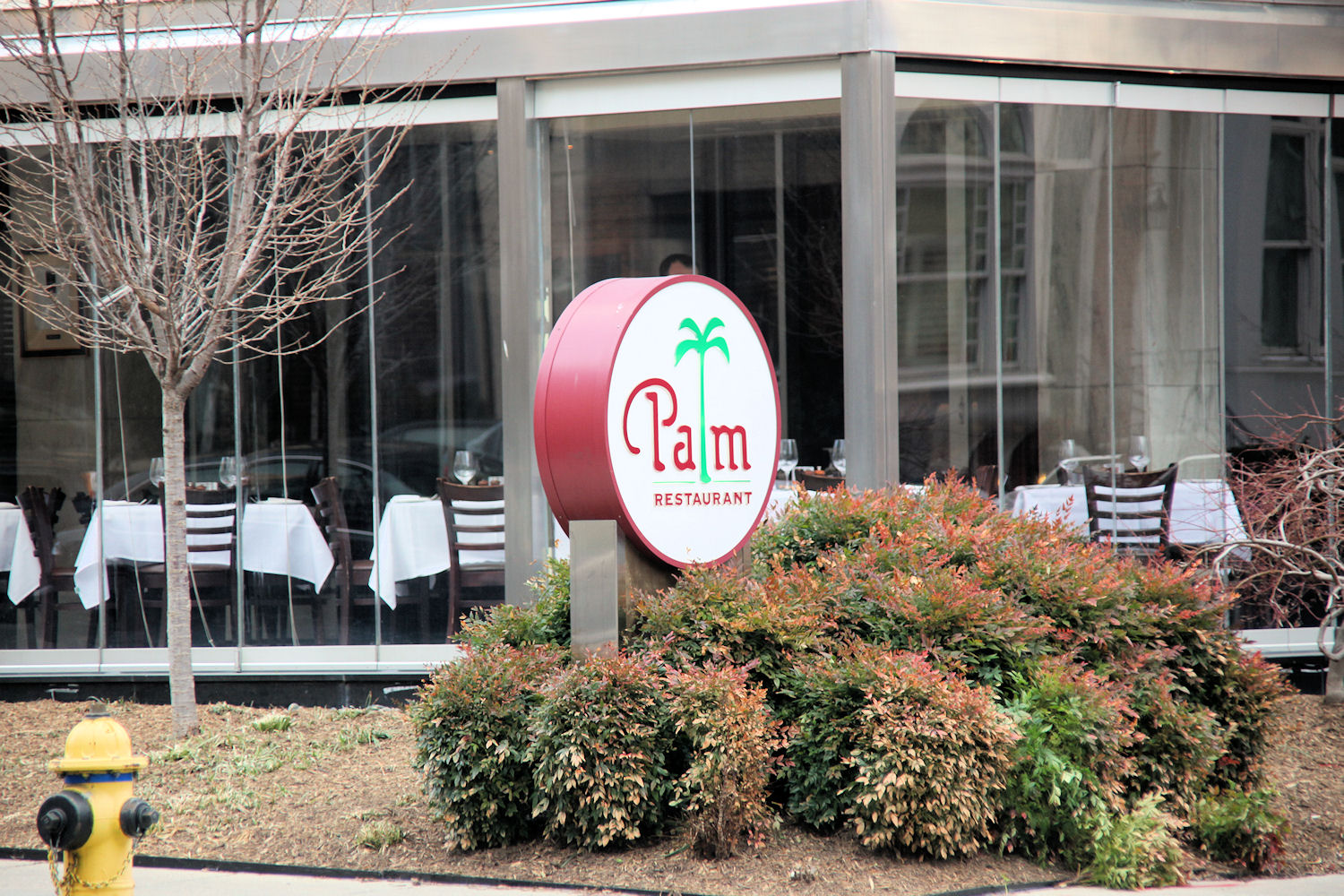
The Palm restaurant in Washington, D.C.

The Palm opened its second location in Washington, D.C. in December 1972. According to the company's web site, the prodding of former U.S. President George H. W. Bush, then U.S. Ambassador to the United Nations, encouraged the families to open the second location. Bush often quipped that there was a "lack of good American fare" in the capital city.

In 1973, the restaurant's third location, the "Palm Too," opened across the street from the original New York location. During the 1970s the restaurants also expanded to three other cities, Los Angeles, Houston and East Hampton, NY.

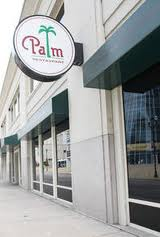
The Palm in downtown Nashville, TN

In 2000, The Palm opened a location in downtown Nashville, TN, situated across from the Nashville Predators Bridgestone Arena.

During the summer of 2011, the Palm underwent a brand refresh, which included new tableware, uniforms, signage, and an updated visual identity manifested in a new website and a new ad campaign. The chain incorporated a number of new dishes into its menu to coincide with the brand refresh. The restaurant's motto is "the place to see and to be seen."

=== Diversification ===
In 1980, the company took over the management of two historic hotels, the Huntting Inn and the Hedges Inn, both located in East Hampton, New York. The company also operated its own wholesale meat company, JORM, though now the Company purchases meat from a third party.

== The Palm today ==
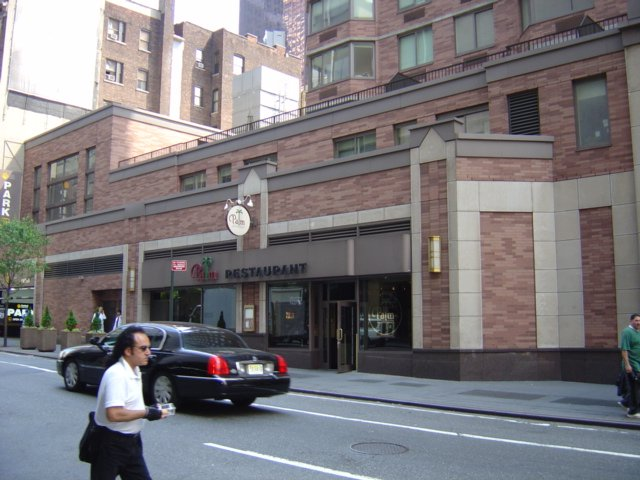
The Palm West Side, New York

In February 2020, Houston-based restaurant operator Landry's acquired The Palm steakhouse chain out of bankruptcy for $50 million.

Today The Palm has approximately 17 locations in cities throughout the United States as well as locations in Mexico.

In 2020, Landry's began the process of terminating The Palm's previous loyalty program, the 837 Club, and replacing it with Landry's own program which is in place at all of their restaurants. Landry's program only provides a cash reward program, which essentially awards 10% of a guest check toward future meals (redeemable in $25 increments). The 837 Club generally provided 7.5% of a guest check toward future meals, but also included more valuable awards at higher redemption levels, including a caricature and party at the Palm to unveil it, and vacation escapes. In addition, guests who spent at least $1,000 at the Palm annually received a free 3lb lobster for their birthday. Landry's is eliminating these longstanding traditions—their own birthday award is simply a $25 credit—which has upset many 837 Club members (many of whom have been members and customers for decades).

Tony Kornheiser, co-anchor of ESPN's Emmy-winning sports television show Pardon the Interruption and former journalist for Newsday, The New York Times, and The Washington Post, visits the Washington location frequently. In recent years, fans of his eponymous D.C. radio show—who refer to themselves as "Littles"—have been known to send or leave notes for Kornheiser at the restaurant, many of which he reads on the air. Additionally, several of the fan-written parody songs that Kornheiser has featured as part of the show's mailbag segment have centered around the Palm and its prominent role in the host's life.

== Cookbooks ==
- Binns, Brigit Légère (2003). The Palm Restaurant cookbook: recipes and stories from the classic American steakhouse. Philadelphia: Running Press. ISBN 0-7624-1583-5. OCLC 53068942.
