= Bright Lights of 1944 =

- Music: Jerry Livingston
- Lyrics: Mack David
- Book: Norman Anthony; Charles Sherman
- Productions: 1943 Broadway

Bright Lights of 1944 was a 1943 Broadway musical revue with music composed by Jerry Livingston and lyrics by Mack David.

It opened at the Forrest Theatre where it played for a total of four performances. The cast featured James Barton, Buddy Clark, and the vaudeville team Smith and Dale.

Act one is set in Sardi's, a New York City Theater District restaurant, where two producers are planning a show. Renee Carroll, an actual hat check girl at Sardi's, played herself in the musical. Smith and Dale played waiters. The second half of the revue is the show the producers were planning in act one, and included the Smith and Dale sketch "Doctor Kronkite".

Music was provided by John Kirby and his orchestra.

Bright Lights of 1944, which cost $72,000 to produce, brought $5,200 in receipts. Writing for The New York Times, Lewis Nichols called the first half of the show "quite bad, being both dull and tedious."
