= Zoe Anderson Norris =

American novelist (1860–1914)

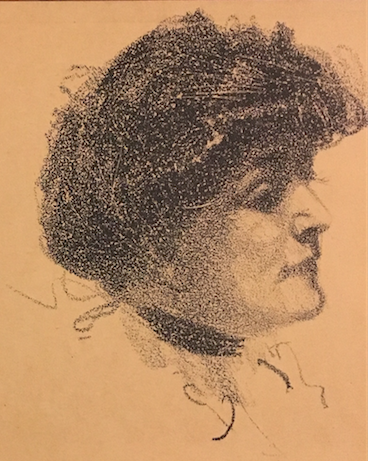
- Born: February 29, 1860; Harrodsburg, Kentucky, United States
- Died: February 13, 1914 (aged 53); New York City, United States
- Occupations: Journalist; novelist; magazine publisher; artist
- Notable work: The Color of His Soul, The Quest of Polly Locke, The Way of the Wind, The East Side

Zoe Anderson Norris (February 29, 1860 – February 13, 1914) was a Kentucky-born journalist, novelist, short story writer and publisher, known for her bimonthly magazine, The East Side (1909–1914), focused on impoverished immigrants in New York. She also contributed to publications including The New York Times, New York Sun, Frank Leslie's Monthly, Harper's Weekly and Argosy. She investigated journalistic topics including corrupt charity executives and child abuse cases. Her fiction plots often centered around starving artists, women deceived by hypocritical suitors, and farmers battling the elements. She founded the Ragged Edge Klub, a group of writers, filmmakers, politicians and performers who met for weekly dinners. She was considered "one of the most popular writers of newspaper sketches in the country" and known as a Queen of Bohemia. An exhibition, To Fight for the Poor With My Pen: Zoe Anderson Norris, Queen of Bohemia, from the collection of independent scholar Eve Kahn, ran March 1-May 13, 2023, at the Grolier Club museum in New York. Kahn's biography, Queen of Bohemia Predicts Own Death: Gilded-Age Journalist Zoe Anderson Norris (Fordham U. Press), came out in 2025.

== Biography ==
Zoe was the 11th of 13 children of Henry Tompkins Anderson (1812–1872) and Henrietta Ducker Anderson (1819–1897). Henry, a Virginia native, was the son of Martha Tompkins and John Burbridge Anderson and a grandson of the politician Garland Anderson (1742–1811). Relatives and direct and collateral ancestors included George Washington, Edward III, and Stephen Gano Burbridge. Henry (whose brother Robert Tompkins Anderson ran an innovative school for the Deaf near Hopkinsville, Kentucky) had two children from a previous marriage when he married Henrietta in 1841. (The couple's descendants include Rear Admiral Robert M. Morris, Rear Admiral Creed Cardwell Burlingame, Kentucky soldiers from the 192nd Tank Battalion who were captured in the Bataan Death March, the singer and teacher Mary Chelf Jones, a founder of the Ragged Edge Theatre, investigative journalist and photojournalist J. Carl Ganter, and the actors Sara Rue and Chris Stack.) Henry served as a Christian Church pastor and teacher in Kentucky while creating a new translation of the New Testament based on ancient Greek manuscripts.

Zoe was born in Harrodsburg, Kentucky, where John Augustus Williams and his wife Mary, who ran Daughters College (now the Beaumont Inn), took in the impoverished Anderson family. Henry, shortly before his death, moved to Washington, D.C., to preach at a church that James A. Garfield attended. Henrietta, as a widow, briefly farmed near Ellsworth, Kansas, with Zoe and other children. (Around 1889, Henrietta was deemed a "lunatic" and sent to Eastern State asylum in Lexington, where she died.) In 1878, Zoe graduated from Daughters College and married a Missouri native, Spencer William Norris (1856–1904). She painted portraits of Harrodsburg residents and family members and taught art at Daughters College. By 1887, the couple had settled in Wichita, Kansas, with their two children, Robert Grimes Norris (1879–1948) and Mary Clarence Norris, known as Clarence (1881–1967). The family settled on North Market Street. Zoe joined cultural groups for women including Hypatia, taught art at Lewis Academy and exhibited paintings on canvas and china at venues including the World's Columbian Exposition in Chicago. Spencer ran a store specializing in fruit and ice cream at 104 North Main Street. By the late 1890s, Zoe had discovered Spencer's infidelities (the couple divorced in 1898) and started writing fiction and journalism for magazines as well as a gossip column for The Wichita Eagle (under the pseudonym Nancy Yanks). She traveled to the Rockies and hiked along Pikes Peak wearing thin slippers.

Zoe and Clarence then spent more than a year in Europe (Robert Norris became a railroad executive) and settled afterwards in New York with Clarence's infant son Robert M. Morris (1901–1984). In 1902, Zoe married an illustrator, J. K. “Jack” Bryans, but she left him upon realizing that he could not support her and did not tolerate her daughter and grandson. (Clarence and Robert eventually returned to Harrodsburg, where Clarence married Fletcher Chelf, a seed company owner, and had two more children; her daughter Mary Chelf Jones was voice teacher at Interlochen Center for the Arts and a mentor of the pianist Kevin Cole.) Around 1906, Zoe moved to a seventh-floor apartment at 338 East 15th Street, and in 1909, she began issuing The East Side, which was illustrated pro bono by William Oberhardt (Zoe also supplied photographs and small sketches for the bimonthly).

Ragged Edge members were known for dancing between meal courses and for smoking cigarettes while simultaneously feasting on spaghetti. Their favorite restaurants included Cafe Boulevard at 156 Second Avenue, Little Hungary on East Houston Street, and Keens steakhouse on West 36th Street. Club members, attendees and other East Side readers included writers, editors and activists such as Edith and Rex Beach, Grace Duffie Boylan, Guido Bruno, Charles E. Chapin, Kathleen Blake Coleman, Winnifred Harper Cooley, James D. Corrothers, Maria Thompson Daviess, Benjamin De Casseres, Helen Hamilton Gardener, Eustace Hale Ball, Sadakichi Hartmann, Waldemar Kaempffert, Leita and Owen Kildare, Richard Le Gallienne, Miriam Leslie, Sophie Irene Loeb, Edwin Markham, Roy McCardell, Shaemas O'Sheel, John Milton Oskison, Patrick L. Quinlan, Ameen Rihani, Nellie Revell, Sydney Rosenfeld, Helen Rowland, Ida Vera Simonton, Clinton Stagg, Sallie Toler (mother of the actor Sidney Toler), Edward Owings Towne, Gertrude Ogden Tubby, Grace Miller White and Ella Wheeler Wilcox. Zoe's works were also lauded and read by the philosopher and tastemaker Elbert Hubbard and the academics David Starr Jordan, James Hardy Ropes, Edwin Robert Anderson Seligman and Benjamin Ide Wheeler. Her writings and parties appealed to politicians, lawyers, scientists, and businessmen as well, including John F. Ahearn, Carrie Astor Wilson, Bird Sim Coler, Lee de Forest, Big Bill Edwards, Frederick L. Hackenburg, Henry DeWitt Hamilton, John Temple Graves, Clifford B. Harmon, Hudson Maxim, James Clark McReynolds, Herman A. Metz, Theodore Shonts, William I. Sirovich, Arthur Stilwell and John Francis Tucker (president of the Twilight Club). Artists, photographers, performers and theater and film executives were in her circle (many of them also involved in Tin Pan Alley), too, such as Arthur Bairnsfather, Jessie Tarbox Beals, Libby Blondell (first wife of actor Edward Blondell, father of Joan Blondell), Platon Brounoff, Louis H. Chalif, Jane Corcoran, Beatrice deMille, Beatrice Forbes-Robertson Hale, Mary Theresa Hart, Burling Hull, Ovide Musin, Charles M. Payne, Wray Physioc, Betty and Will Rogers and Laurette Taylor. Zoe also befriended restaurateurs, including Joel Rinaldo, as well as aviators such as Lincoln Beachey and Mortimer Delano.

The East Side's January/February 1914 issue described Zoe's recent dream that her mother Henrietta had appeared at her bedside and warned of imminent death. Soon after the issue was mailed, Zoe collapsed after a Ragged Edge dinner and died of heart failure at People's Hospital at 203 Second Avenue. (She is buried in Spring Hill Cemetery in Harrodsburg.) Her magazine's premonition was noted in obituaries around the U.S. and in Canada, including in The New York Times, The Washington Post and San Francisco Chronicle.

== Works ==
The villain of Norris's first novel The Color of His Soul (New York: Funk & Wagnalls, 1902, and New York: R. F. Fenno & Co., 1903) was a hypocritical socialist orator, Cecil Mallon, who encourages rebellion among "wage slaves" but sponges off friends and relatives and abandons his pregnant mistress. The book was described as "a keen and relentless satire." Funk & Wagnalls withdrew the 1902 edition after Courtenay Lemon, a chess player turned socialist orator (son of the writer Margaret Lemon, brother of the artist Joseph Lemon, and eventually the husband of Djuna Barnes), recognized himself caricatured in the book and threatened to sue. Norris's novel The Quest of Polly Locke (New York: J. S. Ogilvie, 1902), about a young American woman traveling alone in Europe seeking true love, was said to have a "brilliant, vivacious style." Her final novel, The Way of the Wind (New York: self-published, 1911), portrayed a Kansas farmer, abandoned by his wife, who loses their son to illness and commits suicide, bequeathing valuable real estate (Wichita is built there) to a young female friend who goes insane. Norris collected her short fiction published in the New York Sun in Twelve Kentucky Colonel Stories. Describing Scenes and Incidents in a Kentucky Colonel's Life in the Southland (New York: J. S. Ogilvie, 1905). The Kentucky colonel raconteur was based on her brother-in-law John Burton Thompson Jr.'s twin Philip Burton Thompson; they were the sons of the politician John Burton Thompson.

Her fiction and poetry appeared in publications including 10 Story Book, Ainslee's, The Arena, Argosy, The Bankers Magazine, The Bohemian, The Book-Lover, Boston Ideas, The Bostonian, Brooklyn Life, The Clack Book, Demorest's, Etude and Musical World, Ev'ry Month, Everybody's, Four o'Clock, Frank Leslie's Monthly, Harper's Weekly, The Home Magazine of New York, The Ladies' World, The Midland Monthly, The Mirror, The Monthly Illustrator, Munsey's, The New Age, The New Bohemian, People's, Pearson's, The Peterson Magazine, The Puritan, The Red Letter, Satire, The Smart Set, Success, The Symposium, The Valley Magazine, Wisdom Monthly, Woman's Home Companion and Woman's World. About 50 of her short stories were widely syndicated in newspapers through services including the American Press Association founded by Orlando J. Smith. Recurring characters include male and female writers and artists running out of money, lovers reuniting after quarrels and lonely older people grateful for visitors to listen to their gossip. She included African-American characters such as cakewalk performers, and she wrote about Jewish immigrants traumatized by pogroms in their homelands.

Her journalism appeared in The American Agriculturist, The Bohemian, The Bookman, The Criterion, The Manuscript, New York Press, New York Sun, New York Times, The Thistle (edited by Lee Fairchild) and The Writer. She was a member of the Woman's Press Club. Her topics ranged from exhausted child laborers to Mark Twain's escaped cat Bambino. Her interviewees included Cynthia Alden, David M. Bressler, Phebe Hanaford, Alexander Harkavy, Lillie Devereux Blake, Charles H. Parkhurst, George C. Lorimer, George Roe Van De Water, William T. Jerome, De Lancey Nicoll, John J. Delaney, Alice Fischer, Bat Masterson, Gutzon Borglum, Nat Goodwin, Oliver Herford and Mary Elizabeth Lease. The East Side documented immigrants overcrowded in tenements, working in sweatshops and suffering from disease and starvation. Norris also wrote about her own struggles to make ends meet. The publication was lauded as "written with great vivacity, though evidently inspired by a sincere, earnest, and sympathetic spirit.” Her masthead titles for herself included office boy, bootblack, printer's devil, circulation liar and "the whole shebang." She sometimes reported undercover, dressed as a blind street accordionist, unhoused scrubwoman, or bedraggled recent arrival from Ellis Island, to see how policemen, streetcar conductors, charity workers and passersby treated her.

== Papers ==
Correspondence from Norris survives in a few institutional collections including New York University's Pleiades Club Collection, Wagner College's Edwin Markham Archive, Stanford University's David Starr Jordan papers and Eastern Kentucky University's John Wilson Townsend papers.
