= Alex Gard =

Russian-American cartoonist (1898–1948)

- Алексей Михайлович Кремков
- Born: Alexei Mikhailovich Kremkov; June 17, 1898; Kazan, Russian Empire
- Died: June 1, 1948 (aged 49); New York City, US
- Burial place: Arlington National Cemetery
- Education: Kuznetsov Naval Academy
- Military career
- Allegiance: Russia; United States
- Branch: Imperial Russian Navy; United States Navy
- Wars: World War I; World War II

Alex Gard (born Alexei Mikhailovich Kremkov; (Note: Also romanized as Kremkoff.) Russian: Алексе́й Миха́йлович Кремко́в; June 17, 1898 – June 1, 1948) was a Russian-American cartoonist. He was a regular cartoonist for newspapers, magazines and books, but is most well known for his celebrity caricatures at Sardi's restaurant in New York City.

== Biography ==
He was born Alexei Mikhailovich Kremkov in Kazan, Russia. He graduated from the Naval Academy in Saint Petersburg.

During World War I, he served in the Russian Navy on a destroyer.

Kremkov left Russia after the Bolshevik Revolution. He traveled east through China and Japan before reaching Egypt and finally France, where his name was romanised as Alexis Michel Kremkoff. In Nice, he drew cartoons for the magazine "Sur La Riviera" and then moved to Paris, where he drew cartoons for Le Matin, Fantasio, Sourire and others.

In 1924, he immigrated to New York City, where he began contributing to The New Yorker. He was a long-time contributor to the Sunday drama section of The New York Herald Tribune. He painted theater sets as well, including Nikita Baliyev's Die Fledermaus.

In 1926, he was hired to create caricatures of Broadway and other celebrities for the celebrity wall at Sardi's Restaurant in New York City. Owner Vincent Sardi and Gard drew up a contract which stated Gard would produce caricatures in exchange for one meal per day at the restaurant.

He was naturalized as a U.S. citizen in 1940 (under the name Alexis Gard Kremkoff). During World War II, Gard served in the United States Navy as a specialist first class.

Gard continued to draw caricatures in exchange for meals until his death, ultimately creating more than 700 pictures. Today, the caricatures are housed in the Billy Rose Theatre Collection of the New York Public Library for the Performing Arts.

== Death ==
On June 1, 1948, Gard collapsed on Seventh Avenue and 41st Street. He died as he was being transported to Roosevelt Hospital.

A memorial service was held for Gard at the Russian Orthodox Christ the Saviour Church, followed by a funeral mass the next day. He was buried at Arlington National Cemetery.

== Collection ==
His collection includes about 700 drawings, which includes his caricatures of famous cultural figures, including actors and musicians Paul Ash, Edith Atwater, Pearl Bailey, Eddie Cantor, Katharine Cornell, Ted Healy, Katharine Hepburn, Leslie Howard, Josephine Hull, Bert Lahr, and Ethel Merman; ballet dancers Irina Baronova, Richard Boleslavsky, Leon Danielian, David Lichine and Tatiana Riabouchinska; producer Winthrop Ames, and Met director Edward Robinson.

His collection is housed at the New York Public Library for the Performing Arts.

== Published works ==
- Broadway Portraits by Samuel Marx (New York: Donald Flamm, 1929)
- Ballet Laughs (New York: The Greystone Press, 1941)
- Sailors in Boots (New York: C. Scribner's Sons, 1943)
- Getting Salty (New York: Charles Scribner's Sons, 1944)
- Sick Bay (New York: C. Scribner's Sons, 1945)
- More Ballet Laughs (New York: C. Scribner's Sons, 1946)
- Stars Off Gard (New York: C. Scribner's Sons, 1947)

== Collection ==
His collection includes about 700 drawings, which includes his caricatures of famous cultural figures, including actors and musicians Paul Ash, Edith Atwater, and Pearl Bailey.

== See also ==
- List of caricatures at Sardi's restaurant
