= Clara E. Laughlin =

American writer (1873–1941)

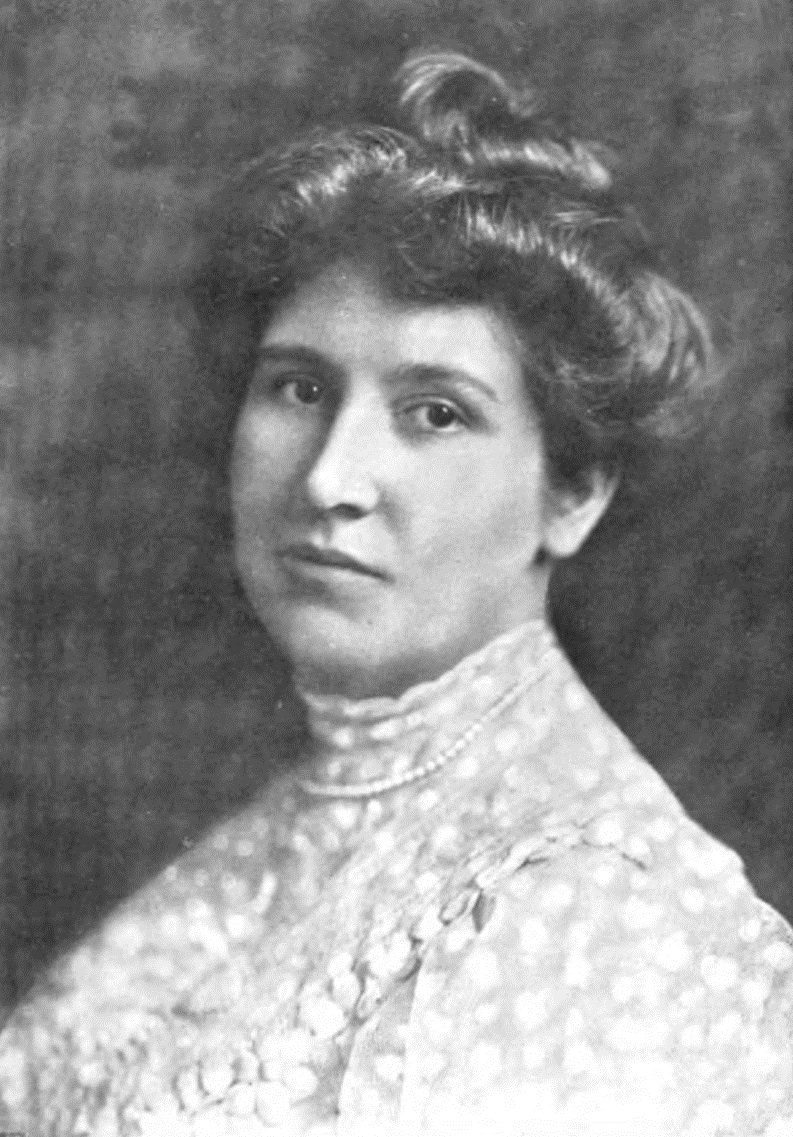
Laughlin circa 1907

Clara Elizabeth Laughlin (August 3, 1873 – March 3, 1941) was an American writer, editor and radio personality. She was born in New York City and lived in Chicago.

== Biography ==
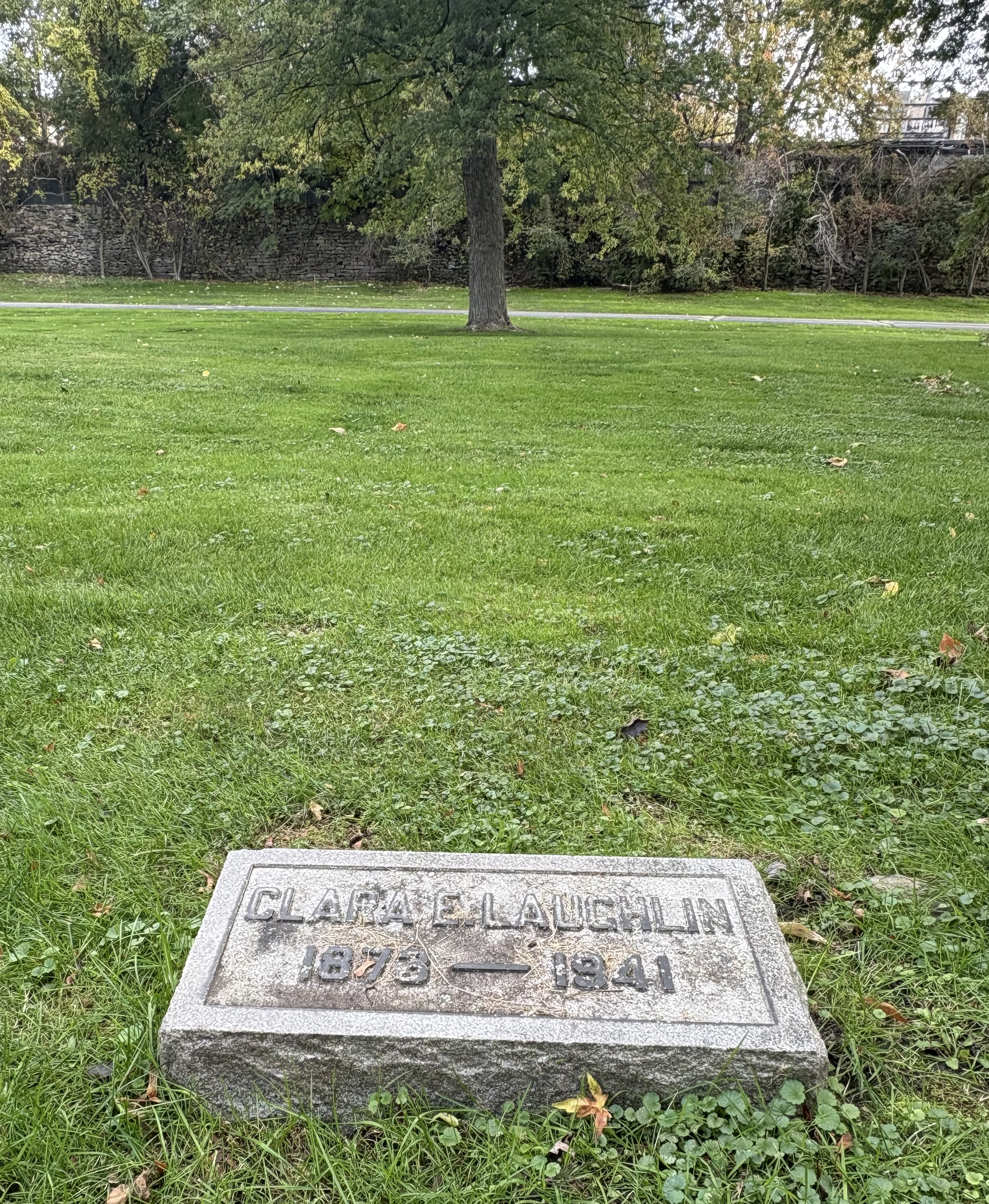
Laughlin's grave at Graceland Cemetery

Clara Elizabeth Laughlin was born on August 3, 1873, in New York City. She graduated from North Division High School in 1890. She wrote more than 35 books. These included biographies of Sarah Bernhardt, Ferdinand Foch, and James Whitcomb Riley, in addition to an autobiography and several novels. She wrote articles for the Ladies Home Journal, and a series of travel books called "So you're going to." Her 1925 guide to Rome was one of the first publications to mention the pasta dish that would eventually become known as Fettuccine Alfredo (the only known earlier mention is in Sinclair Lewis's 1922 novel Babbit).

Laughlin also headed Clara E. Laughlin's Travel Service, which had offices in Chicago, Los Angeles, New York, and Paris, and she published a monthly magazine with circulation of more than 80,000. For three years, she gave travelogues on a radio station in Chicago.

Laughlin died on March 3, 1941, in Chicago, and was buried at Graceland Cemetery.

== Papers ==
Laughlin's papers are held by Smith College and were donated by her nieces.

== Books ==
- The Death of Lincoln; The Story of Booth's Plot, His Deed and the Penalty (1909)

- Everybody's Lonesome; A True Fairy Story (1910)
- The Gleaners; A Novelette (1911)
- Children of To-Morrow (1911), illustrated by Lucius W. Hitchcock
- Evolution of a Girl's Ideal
- The Lady in Gray; A story of the steps by which we climb (1908)
- Divided
- The Penny Philanthropist; A story that could be true (1912)
- The Work-A Day Girl (1913)
- When My Ship Comes Home (1915)
- Reminiscences of James Whitcomb Riley (1916)
- So You're Going to Italy!; And if I were going with you these are the things I would invite you to do (1925)
- So You're Going to Paris! (1925)
- So You're Going to France! (1927)
- So You're Going to England! (1928)
- So You're Going to Rome (1928)
- So You're Going to Spain! (1931)
- So You're Going to Ireland & Scotland (1932)
- Traveling Through Life; Being the Autobiography of Clara E. Laughlin (1934)
- So You're Going to Scandinavia (1937)
- So You're Going to Travel (1938)
- So You're Seeing New England (1940)

== Filmography ==
- The Penny Philanthropist (1917) starring Peggy O'Neil
