= Fettuccine Alfredo =

Creamy pasta dish with butter and cheese

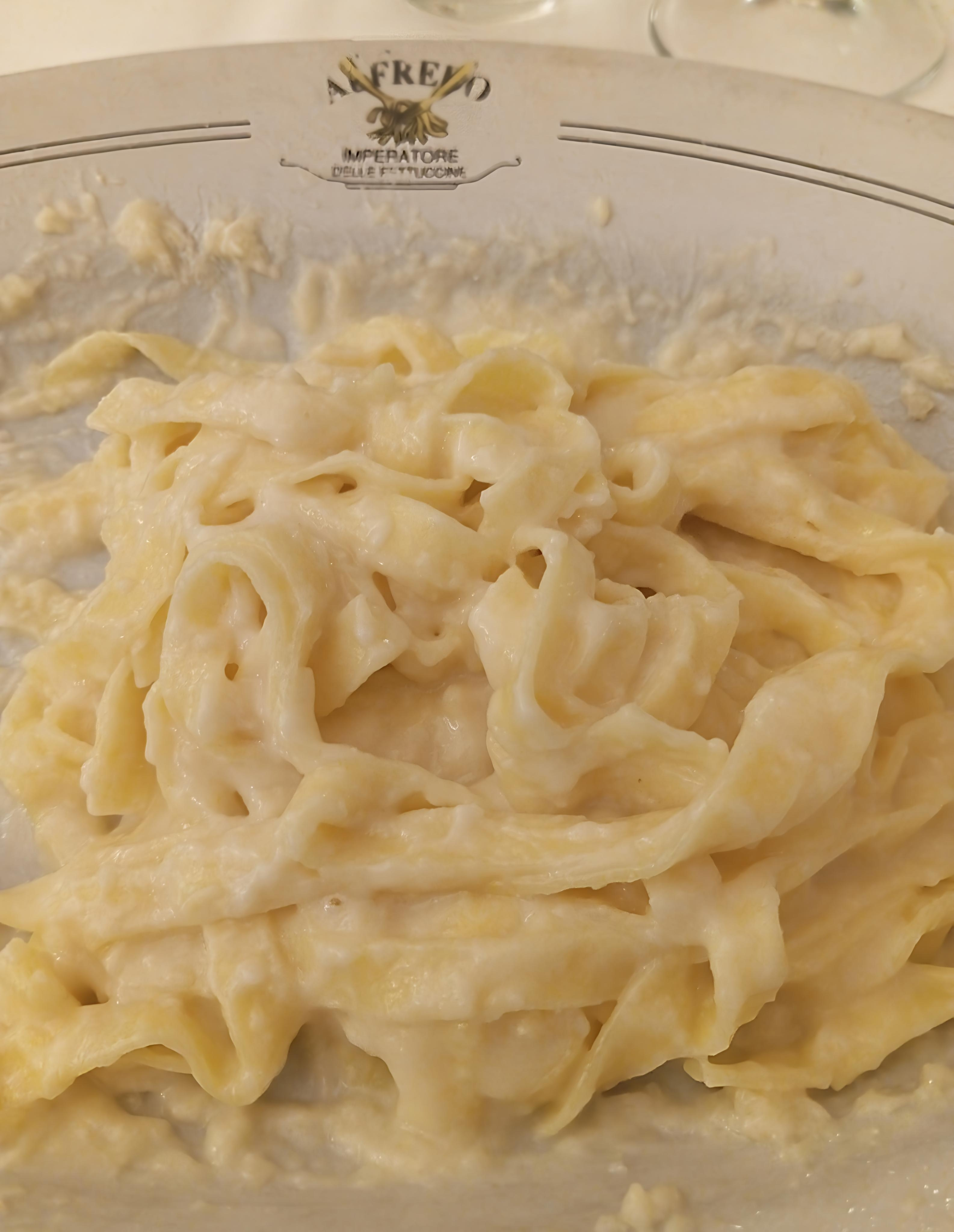
- Course: Primo (Italy); Main (United States)
- Place of origin: Rome, Italy
- Associated cuisine: Italian; Italian-American; global
- Created by: Alfredo di Lelio (1882–1959)
- Invented: c. 1907–1908
- Main ingredients: Fettuccine, butter, Parmesan
- Variations: US additions: heavy cream or half-and-half, chicken, broccoli, parsley, garlic, shrimp, turkey, salmon, mushrooms
- Similar dishes: Fettuccine al burro, pasta burro e parmigiano, pasta in bianco

Fettuccine Alfredo (Italian: [fettut'tʃiːne alˈfreːdo]) is a pasta dish consisting of fettuccine tossed with butter and Parmesan cheese which is melted and emulsified to form a rich cheese sauce coating the pasta. Originating in Rome in the early 20th century, the recipe is now known primarily in the United States and other countries.

The dish is named after Alfredo Di Lelio, a Roman restaurateur who created and popularized it. Di Lelio's tableside service was an integral part of the recipe's early success. Fettuccine Alfredo is a variant of standard Italian preparations fettuccine al burro ('fettuccine with butter'), pasta burro e parmigiano ('pasta with butter and Parmesan cheese'), and pasta in bianco ('plain pasta').

Outside of Italy, cream is sometimes used to thicken the sauce, and ingredients such as chicken, shrimp, or broccoli may be added when Fettuccine Alfredo is served as a main course. Neither cream nor other additional ingredients are used in Italy, where the dish is rarely called "Alfredo" outside of Rome.

== History ==
=== Italian origins ===
In Italy, the combination of pasta with butter and cheese dates to at least the 15th century, when it was mentioned by Martino da Como, a northern Italian cook active in Rome; this recipe for "Roman macaroni" (Italian: maccaroni romaneschi) calls for cooking pasta in broth or water and adding butter, "good cheese" (the variety is not specified) and "sweet spices".

Maccaroni romaneschi

Piglia de la farina che sia bella, et distemperala et fa' la pasta un pocho più grossa che quella de le lasangne, et avoltola intorno ad un bastone. Et dapoi caccia fore il bastone, et tagliala la pasta larga un dito piccolo, et resterà in modo de bindelle, overo stringhe.

Et mitteli accocere in brodo grasso, overo in acqua secundo il tempo. Et vole bollire quando gli metti accocere. Et se tu gli coci in acqua mettevi del butiro frescho, et pocho sale.

Et como sonno cotti mittili in piattelli con bono caso, et butiro, et spetie dolci.

— Maestro Martino da Como (c. 1460). Libro de Arte Coquinaria, Ch. 2 § Maccaroni romaneschi.
Translation:
Roman-style Macaroni

Take some white flour, and add water and make a sheet of pasta slightly thicker than that for lasagne, and wrap it around a stick; and then remove the stick and cut the pasta into pieces the size of your little finger, and they end up with the shape of thin strips or strings.

Cook in fatty broth or in water, depending on the season. But they need to be boiled when you cook them. If you cook them in water, add some fresh butter and a bit of salt.

When they are done, place on a platter with some good cheese, and butter, and sweet spices.

— Translated by Jeremy Parzen (2005)

=== Roman creation ===
Modern Fettuccine Alfredo was created by Alfredo Di Lelio in Rome in the early 20th century. According to family lore, in 1892 Alfredo began to work in a restaurant located in Piazza Rosa that was run by his mother, Angelina. He cooked his first fettuccine al triplo burro ('fettuccine with triple butter' – later called fettuccine all'Alfredo, and eventually "Fettuccine Alfredo") in 1907 or 1908, in what is said to have been an effort to entice his convalescent wife, Ines, to eat after giving birth to their first child, Armando. Recipes attributed to Di Lelio include only three ingredients: fettuccine, "young" Parmesan cheese and butter. Yet there are various legends about the "secret" of the original Alfredo recipe: some say oil is added to the pasta dough; others that the pasta is cooked in milk.

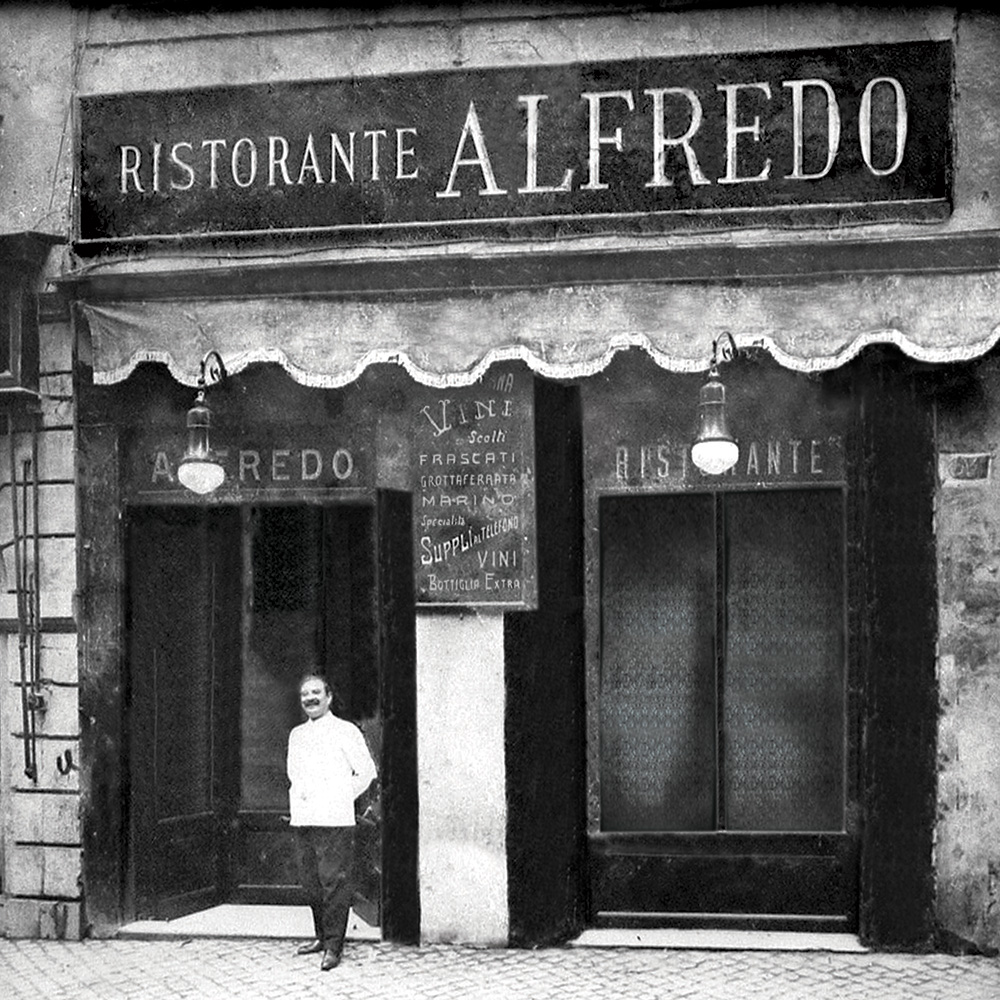
Alfredo Di Lelio in front of Ristorante Alfredo, c. 1914

Piazza Rosa was condemned to make way for the construction of the Galleria Colonna (c. 1910) and his mother's restaurant was forced to close. Di Lelio subsequently opened his own restaurant on the via della Scrofa (c. 1914). Following a visit to Ristorante Alfredo by the American actors Mary Pickford and Douglas Fairbanks – who, at the time of his visit in the early 1920s was known as "The King of Hollywood", Alfredo began to serve his signature dish using a golden fork and spoon bearing the inscription "To Alfredo the King of the noodles" (said to have been a gift from the famous Hollywood couple in gratitude for Alfredo's hospitality). Di Lelio's fame and success grew (he was knighted by the King of Italy, making him a Cavaliere dell'Ordine della Corona d'Italia) until war rationing made it increasingly difficult to obtain flour, eggs, and butter. He sold the restaurant to two of his waiters for the war, in 1943.

After the war, in 1950, Di Lelio opened a new restaurant in Piazza Augusto Imperatore with his son Armando. He vigorously promoted the restaurant by creating a celebrity wall of fettuccine-themed photographs showing himself (in humorous poses, with his pasta and gold cutlery) serving dignitaries, politicians, famous musicians and film stars such as James Stewart, Bob Hope, Anthony Quinn, Bing Crosby, Gary Cooper, Jack Lemmon, Ava Gardner, Tyrone Power, Ronald Reagan, Sophia Loren, Cantinflas, and many others. The dish was so well known that Di Lelio was invited to demonstrate it both in Italy and abroad. The fame of the dish, by this time called maestosissime fettuccine all'Alfredo ('most majestic Alfredo-style fettuccine') on Alfredo's menus, was heightened by the tableside "spectacle reminiscent of grand opera" during its preparation, "in a ritual of extraordinary theatricality".

[The] owner mixes the pasta and lifts it high to serve it, the white threads of cheese gilded with butter and the bright yellow of the ribbons of egg pasta offering an eyeful for the customer; at the end of the ceremony, the guest of honor is presented the golden cutlery and the serving dish, where the blond fettuccine roll around in the pale gold of the seasonings. It's worth seeing the whole ceremony. The owner, son of old Alfredo and looking exactly like him [...] bends over the great skein of fettuccine, fixes it intensely, his eyes half-closed, and dives into mixing it, waving the golden cutlery with grand gestures, like an orchestra conductor, with his sinister upwards-pointing twirled moustache dancing up and down, pinkies in the air, a rapt gaze, flailing elbows.

Both the old restaurant (now called Alfredo alla Scrofa), and the post-war iteration (known as Il Vero Alfredo and still run by the Di Lelio family) serve "fettuccine Alfredo" and compete vigorously, with escalating puffery (e.g., "the king of fettuccine", "the real king of fettuccine", "the magician of fettuccine", "the emperor of fettuccine", "the real Alfredo", etc.). In 1981, there were about 50 restaurants in Rome selling similar fettuccine dishes, mostly called fettuccine alla romana.

Fettuccine Alfredo, minus the spectacle, has become ubiquitous in Italian-style restaurants outside of Italy, although despite its worldwide renown, in Italy this dish is usually still called simply fettuccine al burro. According to the Roman edition of the Corriere della Sera, since 2005 Fettuccine Alfredo Day has been celebrated on 7 February "throughout the world" to commemorate Di Lelio's famous creation.

=== American popularization ===
The dish has long been popular with Americans, who, when in Rome, have often sought out its historical origins.

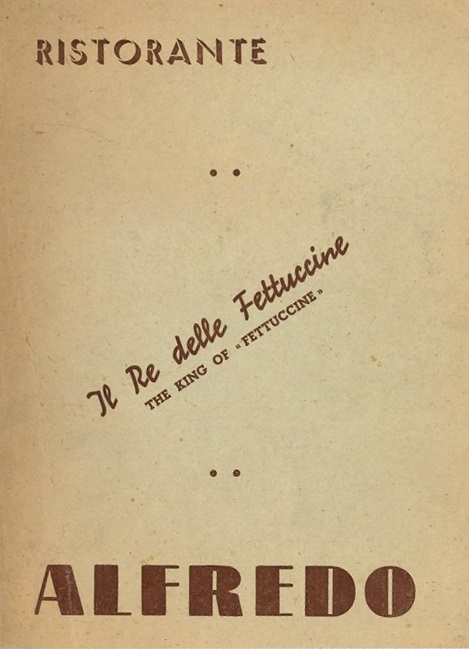
Ristorante Alfredo menu, undated

Alfredo's noodles have been extolled in US newspapers, magazines, cookbooks, and guidebooks since as early as the 1920s. In one of her popular travel guides, So You're Going to Rome!, Clara Laughlin writes, "Most travellers would blush to admit they had been in Rome and had not eaten Alfredo's fettuccine al burro." Sinclair Lewis's 1922 novel Babbitt makes reference to "a little trattoria on the Via della Scrofa where you get the best fettuccine in the world".

In the late 1920s and early 1930s, the American food writer and restaurateur George Rector wrote about "Alfredo's noodles", describing in detail the restaurateur's elaborate tableside preparation ceremony; he did not give the dish a specific name. In a later account, Rector mentions the addition of accompanying violin music and golden tableware.

This act of mixing the butter and cheese through the noodles becomes quite a ceremony when performed by Alfredo in his tiny restaurant in Rome. As busy as Alfredo is with other duties, he manages to be at each table when the waiter arrives with the platter of fettuccine to be mixed by him. As a violinist plays inspiring music, Alfredo performs the sacred ceremony with a fork and spoon of solid gold. Alfredo does not cook noodles. He does not make noodles. He achieves them.

— George Rector (1933)

By the 1920s Alfredo was billing himself as Il Re delle Fettuccine 'The King of Fettuccine' (printed on his menus in both Italian and English), although when exactly the "fettuccine Alfredo" appellation came about is unclear. A 1925 Italian guidebook and its English translation uses "fettuccine al burro"; however, a 1927 article by Alice Rohe mentions "noodles Alfredo". Throughout this period and beyond, restaurant reviews, advertisements, and recipes for "noodles Alfredo" (1927 and 1929), "Alfredo's spaghetti" (1939), "fettuccine all'Alfredo" (1956), and eventually "fettuccine Alfredo" (1957 and 1964) began to crop up in various publications.

In 1966, the Pennsylvania Dutch Noodle Company started selling their dried "fettuccine egg noodles" with an "Alfredo" recipe on the package. In addition to the traditional Parmesan cheese and butter, this version also included Swiss cheese and cream.

In 1977, Armando Di Lelio (Alfredo's son) and a partner opened a restaurant called "Alfredo's" near Rockefeller Center in New York, and several years later, another in Epcot at Disney World –both of which have since closed. More recently, Ines Di Lelio (Alfredo's granddaughter) has operated or licensed the "Il Vero Alfredo" name to restaurants in Mexico and Saudi Arabia.

The two largest full-service Italian-American restaurant chains, Olive Garden and Carrabba's Italian Grill, both serve and advertise the dish widely. A smaller chain, Il Fornaio, which says that its goal is to "provide our guests with the most authentic Italian experience outside of Italy", does not serve fettuccine Alfredo.

Some American food writers recommend that home cooks follow Di Lelio's three-ingredient formula. Writing in Bon Appétit, the Italian-American chef Carla Lalli Music notes that "American cooks added heavy cream or half-and-half to thicken and enrich the sauce. To each their own, but no authentic fettuccine Alfredo recipe should include cream (because it dulls the flavor of the cheese)."

The dish has its enthusiasts and its detractors. In 2018, the restaurant critic Pete Wells said of one version, "The Alfredo sauce, sweetly dripping from the fettuccine like rain from a leaf, hit me like a prescription opiate that had been specifically engineered for my opiate receptors. It's been a long time since I'd had fettuccine Alfredo". In 1981, the travel writer Paul Hoffman called the Roman versions "one of the most tempting and at the same time simplest pasta specialties". On the other hand, the food writer Gillian Riley says that the fettuccine of Rome "hardly need Alfredo's gross sauce of butter, cream [sic], and cheese".

The American nutrition advocate Michael Jacobson described fettuccine Alfredo as a "heart attack on a plate".

== Alfredo sauce ==
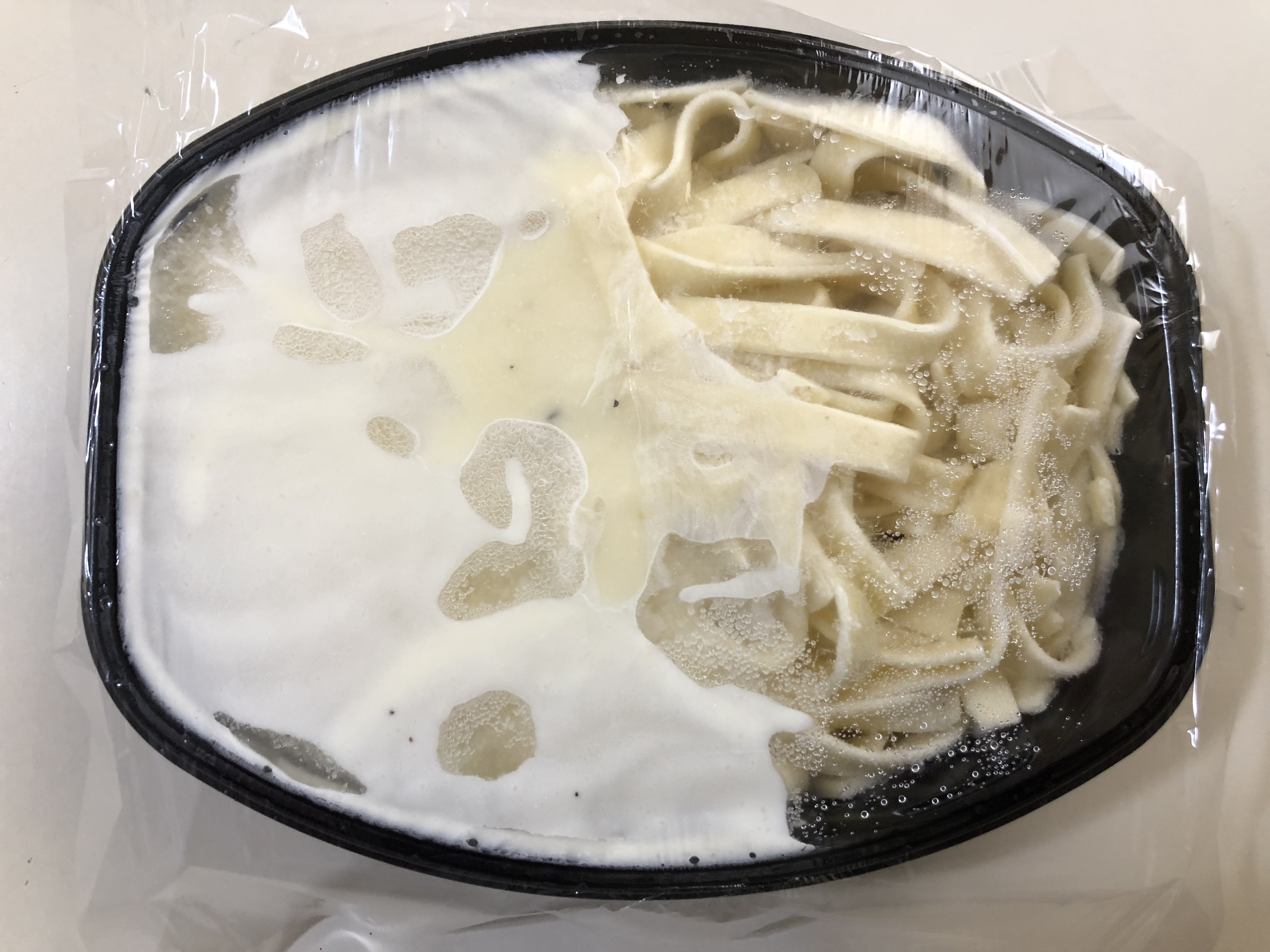
Stouffer's frozen fettuccine Alfredo pictured with protective plastic film (before heating)

In the United States, shelf-stable Alfredo sauce is sold by brands such as Ragú, Trader Joe's, Whole Foods Market, Bertolli, Kroger, Classico, Prego, Rao's, Newman's Own, Signature Select, and Saclà in glass jars for home cooks. Giovanni Rana and Buitoni sell fresh Alfredo sauces in plastic tubs that must be refrigerated. The Alaska Seasoning Company makes "Alfredo sauce powder", a spice mix to which, according to the company, one "simply [adds] cream [to] make a restaurant style Alfredo Sauce". These sauces are marketed at various price points and quality levels, and are often reviewed in food-related publications.

The British retailer ASDA sells a version called "New York creamy chicken Alfredo sauce".

Other Alfredo variants and formats such as pre-packaged fresh, boil-in-bag, or ready to eat frozen meals are also widely available in the United States. In the late 1970s, McDonald's experimented with a dinner menu that included fettuccine Alfredo, pizza, lasagna, and McSpaghetti. These options are no longer available in the US.

In Italy, Alfredo alla Scrofa began offering its own version of salsa Alfredo in 2020. Sold in glass jars and promoted as using only the highest-quality ingredients, the sauce contains Parmesan (43%), water, butter, rice flour, and sunflower seed oil – but no cream.

== See also ==
- Italian-American cuisine
- List of foods named after people
- List of pasta
- List of pasta dishes
- List of sauces
