= Fettuccine =

Type of pasta

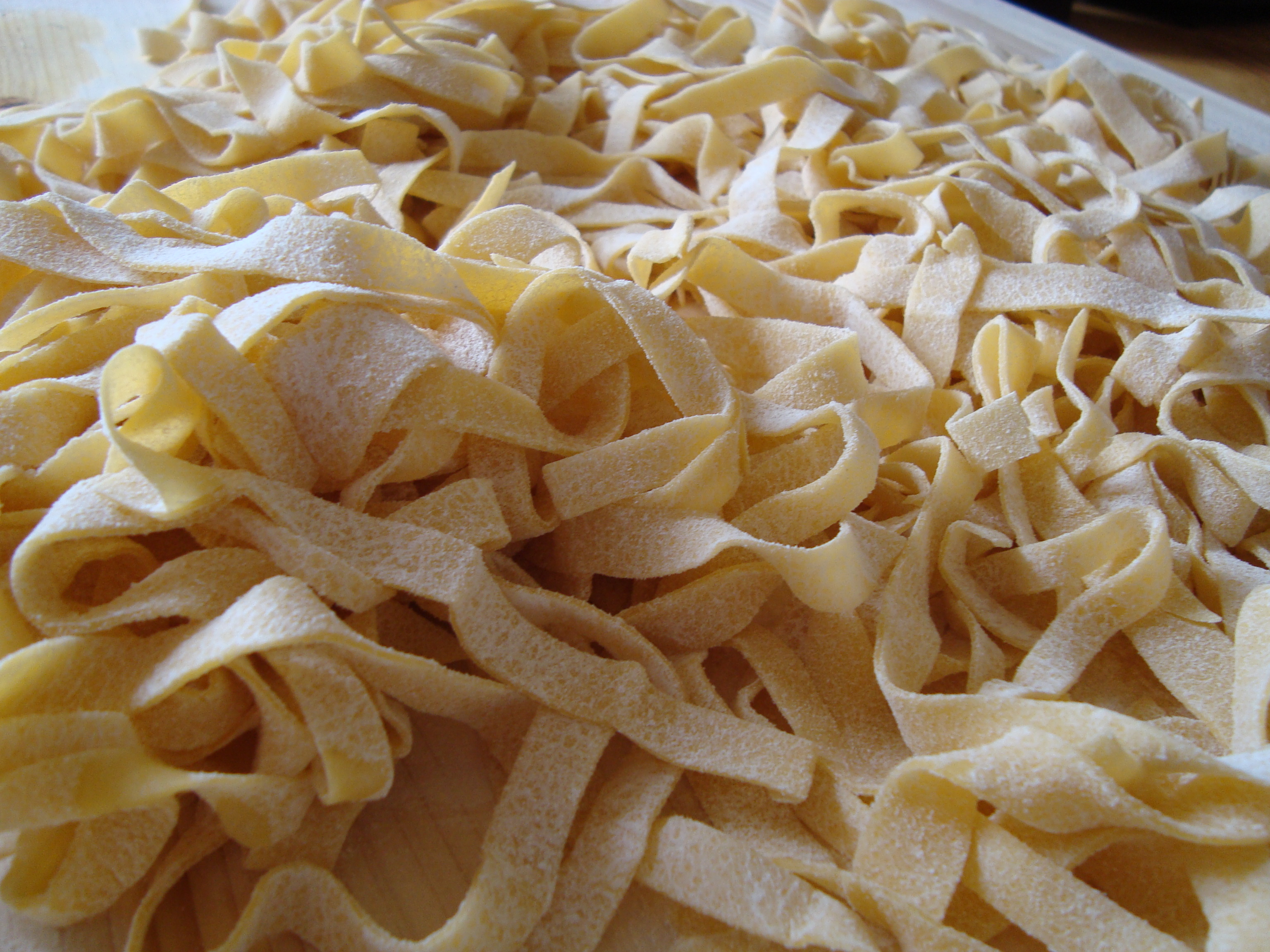
- Fresh, uncooked fettuccine
- Alternative names: Fettucce (wider), fettuccelle (narrower)
- Type: Pasta
- Place of origin: Italy
- Main ingredients: Durum wheat flour, eggs

Fettuccine (Note: English: /ˌfɛtəˈtʃiːni/ fet-ə-CHEE-nee, UK also /ˌfɛtʊ-/ fet-uu-, Italian: [fettutˈtʃiːne]; lit. 'little ribbons'; sing. fettuccina.) is a type of pasta popular in Roman cuisine. It is descended from the extremely thin capelli d'angelo of the Renaissance, but is a flat, thick pasta traditionally made with egg and flour (usually one egg for every 100 grams or 3.5 ounces of flour). At about 6.5 mm (1/4 inch), it is wider and thicker than, but similar to, the tagliatelle typical of Bologna.

The terms fettucce and fettuccelle are often used as synonyms for this pasta, but the former term is more precisely used for wider (about 13 mm or 1/2 inch) and the latter for narrower (about 3 mm or 1/8 inch) forms of the same pasta.

Fettuccine is often classically eaten with sugo d'umido ('beef ragù') or ragù di pollo ('chicken ragù'). A famous dish made with fettuccine is fettuccine Alfredo, which was created and named at a restaurant in Rome in the early 20th century as a tableside "performance". It is popular in the United States, where it is made with cream, although this is almost unknown in Italy.

== See also ==
Media related to Fettuccine at Wikimedia Commons

- List of pasta
