= George Rector =

American food writer and restaurateur (1878–1947)

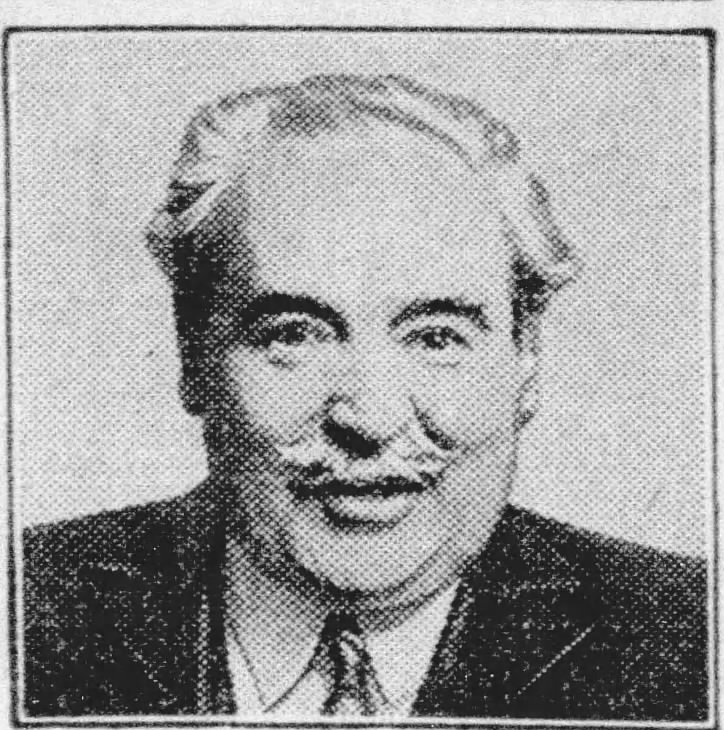
- Rector in 1929
- Born: 1878
- Died: 1947 (aged 68–69)
- Occupation: Restaurateur
- Writing career
- Subject: Food

George Rector (1878–1947) was a restaurateur, raconteur and food authority who wrote several cookbooks in the 1920s and '30s. He appeared on radio on the Columbia Broadcasting System in Dine with George Rector and played himself in at least one movie, Every Day's a Holiday (1937), with Mae West.

In the introduction to his 1939 book, Home on the Range, Rector described himself as "a sort of food representative at large", as well as an "author of several books, of a series of Saturday Evening Post articles, and of a column published by 22 newspapers—been filmed—talked to the national radio audience".

== Biography ==
Rector was born in Chicago, where his father, Charles E. Rector, ran Rector's Oyster House. He claimed his father took him out of Cornell University where he was studying law, and sent him to Paris to learn how to make a sauce for filet of sole. Doubt has been cast on parts of this story.

Rector and his father ran several restaurants in New York State and Chicago. In Home on the Range, he wrote that he got his start in the business peeling potatoes and cleaning chickens in his father's kitchens.

At Rector's on Broadway in New York City, he and his father were known for serving celebrities of the 1910s. George Rector's New York Times obituary stated Rector's was "a leading resort of the theatrical, financial and social worlds of those days". The restaurant closed with the coming of prohibition.

Rector's Broadway location gained fame in a 1909 Broadway musical, The Girl from Rector's. The girl was fictional.

He was one of the first writers to mention Fettuccine Alfredo, the now ubiquitous Italian-American pasta dish.

Rector also operated Frontier House in Lewiston, New York, which is now on the Register of Historic Places.

Rector died at Doctors Hospital, in New York City, November 26, 1947, at the age of 69. His widow, Mabelle Rector, died in their Stamford, Connecticut, home less than two months later at the age of 56.

== See also ==
- Hotel Claridge

== Bibliography ==
Books by George Rector:

- The Girl from Rector's, Doubleday, Page & Company, 1927.
- The Rector Cook Book, Chicago, Ill. Rector Pub. Co., 1928.
- A la Rector, Copyright The Great Atlantic and Pacific Tea Company, 1933.
- Dine at Home with Rector, E.P. Dutton & Co, Inc 1937 (Kirkus Reviews, Apr 01, 1937, Furnas, J. C.).
- Dining in New York with Rector, Prentice-Hall, Inc., 1939 (Kirkus Reviews, Jun 15, 1939).
- Home at the Range, Rector Publishing 1939.

Book about George Rector:

- Rector's Naughty '90s Cookbook, by Alexander Kirkland assisted by Muriel Shaffer, Doubleday, 1949 (Kirkus Reviews, Jun 15, 1949 – Kirkland, Alexander, and Kirkus Reviews, Nov 01, 1949 – Kirkland, Alexander).
