= Celebrity wall =

Portraits of celebrities in restaurants

A celebrity wall, caricature wall, or wall of fame is a gallery of photographs or caricatures of celebrities, typically found on the wall of restaurants and bars. They suggest that celebrities are liable to be encountered there, and also function as publicity for the celebrities. The portraits are often signed by their subject, showing that the portraits were "made from life, a document of an authentic celebrity encounter between artist and subject".

== History ==
Early celebrity walls first developed in downtown theater districts. An early example was at Chapin & Gore in Chicago, in the 1870's, which was near McVicker's Theater. The wall included actors, politicians, and leading industrialists. A back room included "'indecent and obscene' caricatures of European notables".

== List ==
Some well-known celebrity walls are found at:

=== United States ===
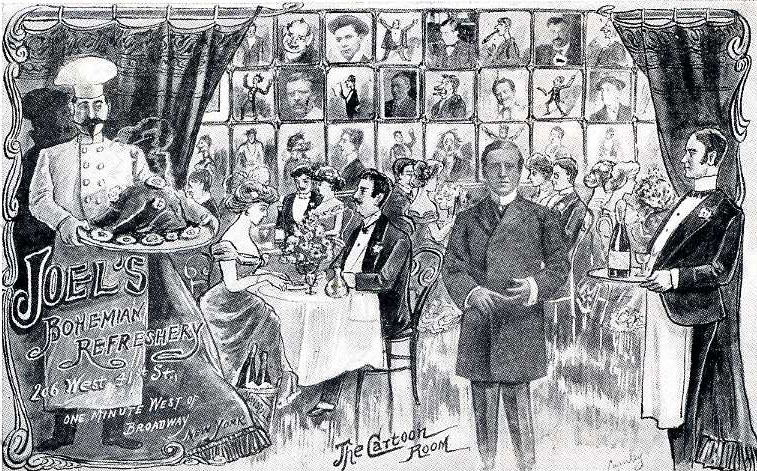
Postcard of Cartoon Wall at Joel's Bohemian Refreshery

- 1870s: Chapin & Gore, Chicago (defunct).
- 1890s: Otto Moser's café, Cleveland
- 1910: Joel's Bohemia, New York (defunct); cartoons by Carlo de Fornaro.
- 1914: The Blue Ribbon, New York (defunct)
- 1927: Sardi's, New York, popular with theater people. Inspired by the caricature walls at the Parisian restaurant Joe Zelli's. Alex Gard provided 720 caricatures over a period of twenty years in exchange for daily meals. Other caricaturists included John Mackey, Donald Bevan, Richard Baratz; see the List of caricatures at Sardi's.
- 1920s: The Palm, New York and branches, with caricatures drawn directly on the walls by Jolly Bill Steinke, Mac Miller, Bill Lignante, Bronwyn and Bill Bird, Zack Bird, and others.
- 1929: Brown Derby, Hollywood, Los Angeles (defunct), popular with the film industry: caricatures by Eddie Vitch, Jack Lane, Nicholas Volpe, and Douglas Bunn.
- London Chop House, Detroit: caricatures by Hy Vogel.

=== Europe ===
- Alfredo alla Scrofa and Il Vero Alfredo, Rome, the originators of fettuccine Alfredo.
- Joe Zelli's, Paris.

== See also ==
- List of halls and walks of fame, for standalone walls of fame for particular fields of endeavor
