= Vincent Sardi Jr. =

American restaurateur (1915–2007)

- Born: Vincent Sardi Jr. July 23, 1915; New York City, U.S.
- Died: January 4, 2007 (aged 91); Berlin, Vermont, U.S.
- Education: Columbia College; Columbia Business School (BS)
- Occupation: Restaurateur
- Spouses: Carolyn Euiller (m. 1939; div. 1946) Adele Rasey (divorced): June Keller
- Father: Vincent Sardi Sr.

Vincent Sardi Jr. (July 23, 1915 – January 4, 2007) was an American restaurateur who owned and operated Sardi's restaurant, which was founded by his father Vincent Sardi Sr., for more than 50 years. He was dubbed as the "unofficial mayor of Broadway" by The New York Times due to the central presence of his restaurant in the world of Broadway shows.

== Biography ==
Sardi was born on July 23, 1915, in Manhattan and spent his early childhood in a railroad flat on West 56th Street before moving to a brownstone at 246 West 44th Street, where his father, Vincent Sardi Sr., founded Sardi's restaurant. Sardi attended Holy Cross Academy and appeared in a Broadway play at the Little Theatre. The Sardi family moved to Flushing, Queens, and Sardi attended Flushing High School.

He entered Columbia College with the class of 1937 as a pre-medical student. However, Sardi failed the chemistry examination because he had sold his textbook at Barnes & Noble so he could attend a dance. He then transferred to Columbia Business School after two years, graduating in 1937. In the meantime, Sardi worked at the family business and worked at the Ritz-Carlton Hotel before rejoining Sardi's in 1939 as dining-room captain.

Sardi joined the Marine Corps and was assigned to run the bachelor officers’ mess at the Marine Corps Air Station Cherry Point in North Carolina in 1942. In 1945 he was sent to Okinawa to supervise a rest camp. He left the Marines as a captain.

After serving in the military, he took over the restaurant when his father retired in 1947. He was known for extending lines of credit to unemployed Broadway actors and offered special menus with reduced prices to them. He also made sure to attend every show and insisted that his headwaiters do the same so that the actors would be well treated.

He was president of the Greater Times Square Committee in the 1960s and the Restaurant League of New York in the 1970s, serving as official and unofficial spokesperson of Manhattan's Theater District. He later opened a branch of the restaurant on East 54th Street and a dinner theater in Long Island but neither turned out to be a success.

In 1985, he sold the restaurant to a pair of producers Ivan Bloch and Harvey Klaris and restaurateur Stuart Lichtenstein. He regained ownership of the restaurant in 1991 and due to his failing health, turned the operation of the restaurant to his business partner Max Klimavicius.

In 2004, Sardi received a Tony Honor for Excellence in Theatre, an award also given to his father during the first year of the Tony Awards in 1947.

== Personal life ==
Sardi was an amateur sports car racer, polo player, and skier. He was nicknamed "Cino" by his father.

Sardi was married three times, to Carolyn Euiller (1939–1946), Adelle Rasey, and June Keller. He died on January 4, 2007, at age 91 in Berlin, Vermont. He was a longtime resident of Warren, Vermont at the time of his death. The marquee lights of all Broadway theaters were dimmed for one minute on January 5, 2007, in memory of Sardi.
