= Joel Rinaldo =

New York restaurateur (1870–1956)

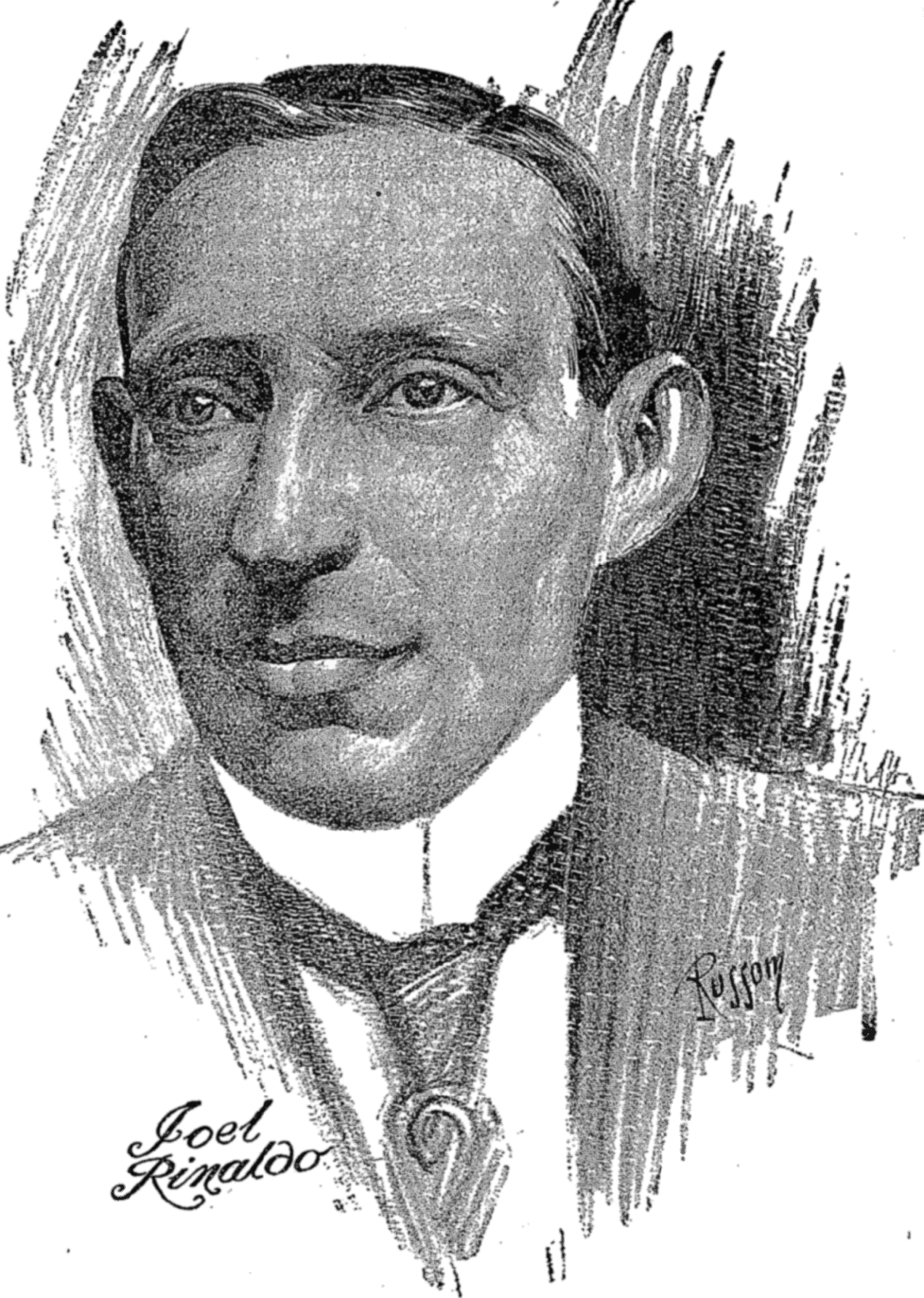
Joel Rinaldo, 1913

Joel Rinaldo (June 11, 1870 – December 23, 1956) was a restaurateur whose restaurant and hotel, Joel's Bohemia, near Times Square, was a Manhattan institution from 1902 to 1925.

== Life ==
Rinaldo was born in New York City on June 11, 1870 to Marks Rinaldo and Minnie (Ellis) Rinaldo, immigrants from Poland ultimately of Portuguese Jewish origin.

He opened his restaurant "Joel's" in 1902, catering to artists, writers, revolutionaries and other bohemians.

In 1910, Rinaldo self-published his theory of evolution, "polygeneric theory", which hypothesized that each species was independently created when its time had come. In 1921, following Prohibition-based raids on his establishment, he published Psychoanalysis of the "Reformer": A Further Contribution to the Sexual Theory which purported to demonstrate that the passion for reform of their neighbors by those who favored prohibition was a neurosis akin to a passion for "rape" or "eating caviar".

Rinaldo retired to Brooklyn in 1926 and died on December 23, 1956.

== Works ==
- Rinaldo's Polygeneric Theory, self-published (1910), hardcover
- Psychoanalysis of the "Reformer" A Further Contribution to the Sexual Theory, preface by Andre Tridon, Lee Publishing Company (1921), 137 pages.

== External links and further reading ==
- Benjamin De Casseres, "Joel's", The American Mercury 26:103:360 (July 1932)
- Jan Whitaker, "Joel's bohemian refreshery", Restaurant-ing through history, July 17, 2008
