= Sardi's =

Restaurant in Manhattan, New York

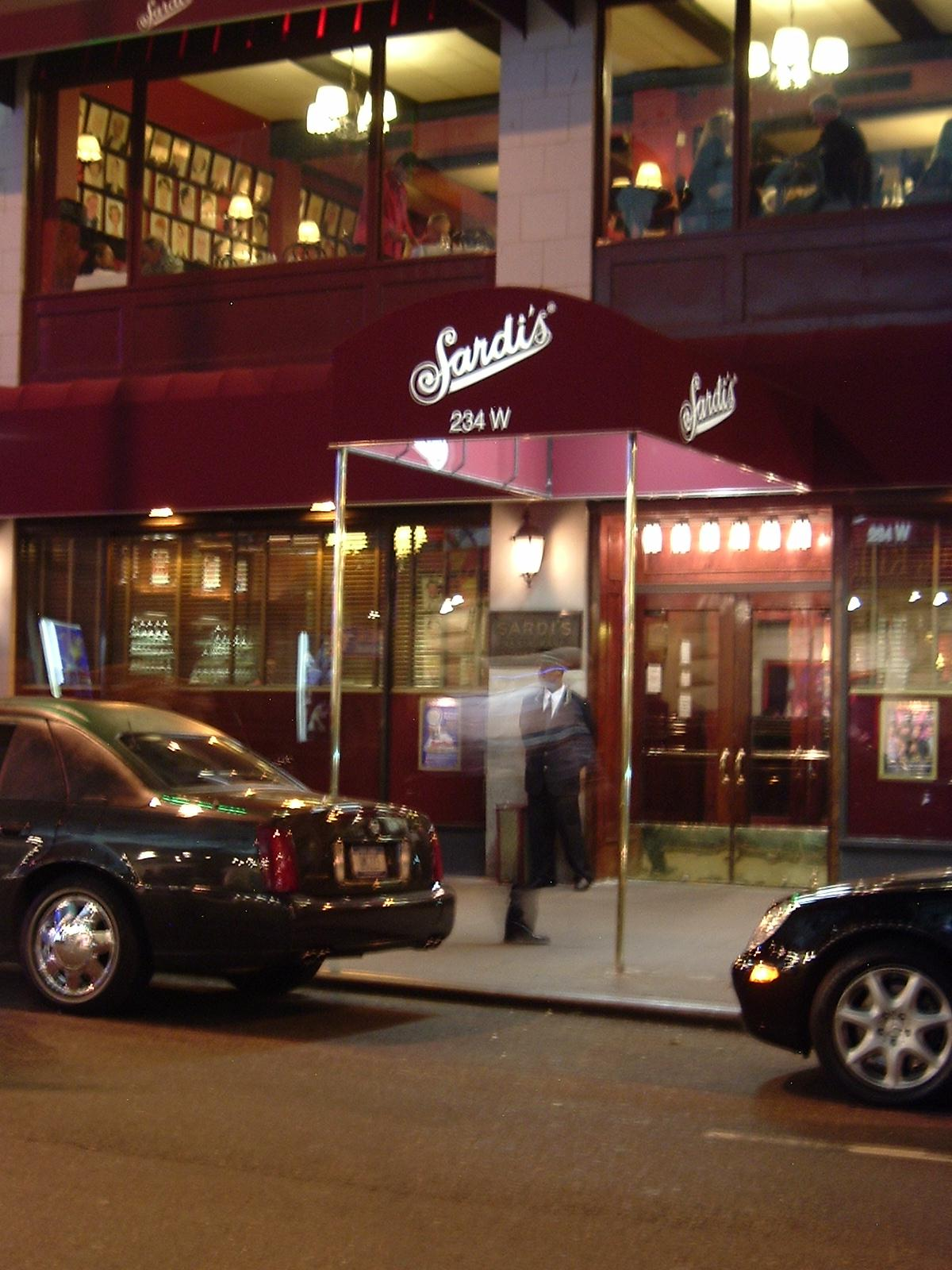
- Sardi's entrance: rows of caricatures are visible through the upstairs windows
- Interactive map of Sardi's

Restaurant information
- Established: March 5, 1927
- Owner: Max Klimavicius
- Previous owners: Vincent Sardi Sr. Vincent Sardi Jr.
- Food type: Continental
- Location: 234 West 44th Street (between Broadway and Eighth Avenue), New York City, New York, 10036, United States
- Coordinates: 40°45′28.48″N 73°59′15.12″W
- Website: sardis.com

Sardi's is a continental restaurant located at 234 West 44th Street, between Broadway and Eighth Avenue, in the Theater District of Manhattan, New York City. Sardi's opened at its current location on March 5, 1927. It is known for the caricatures of Broadway celebrities on its walls, of which there are over a thousand.

Sardi's was founded by Vincent Sardi Sr. and his wife Jenny Pallera, who had previously operated a restaurant nearby between 1921 and 1926. To attract customers, Sardi Sr. hired Russian refugee Alex Gard to draw caricatures in exchange for free food. Even after Gard's death, Sardi's continued to commission caricatures. Following the death of Vincent Sardi Sr. in 1969, Sardi's started to decline in the 1980s, eventually being sold off in 1986. After closing temporarily in 1990, it reopened with new staff. It was sold to the Shubert Organization in 2026.

The restaurant is today considered an institution in Broadway theatre. Over the years, the restaurant became known as a pre- and post-theater hangout, as well as a location for opening night parties, and was where the idea of the Tony Award was devised.

== History ==
=== Creation and early years ===
Melchiorre Pio Vincenzo "Vincent" Sardi Sr. (born in San Marzano Oliveto, Italy, on December 23, 1885; died November 19, 1969) and his wife Eugenia ("Jenny") Pallera (born in Castell'Alfero, Italy, on July 14, 1889; died November 17, 1978) opened their first eatery, The Little Restaurant, in the basement of 246 West 44th Street in 1921. When that building was slated for demolition in 1926 to make way for the St. James Theatre, Sardi and Pallera accepted an offer from the Shubert brothers theatrical family to relocate to a new building the brothers were erecting down the block. The new restaurant, Sardi's, opened March 5, 1927.

When business slowed after the move, Vincent Sardi sought a gimmick to attract customers. Recalling the movie star caricatures that decorated the walls of Joe Zelli's, a Parisian restaurant and jazz club, Sardi decided to recreate that effect in his establishment. He hired a Russian refugee named Alex Gard to draw Broadway celebrities. Sardi and Gard drew up a contract that stated Gard would make the caricatures in exchange for one meal per day at the restaurant. The first official caricature by Gard was of Ted Healy, the vaudevillian of Three Stooges fame. Sardi's son, Vincent Sardi Jr., took over restaurant operations in 1947.

=== Height of popularity ===
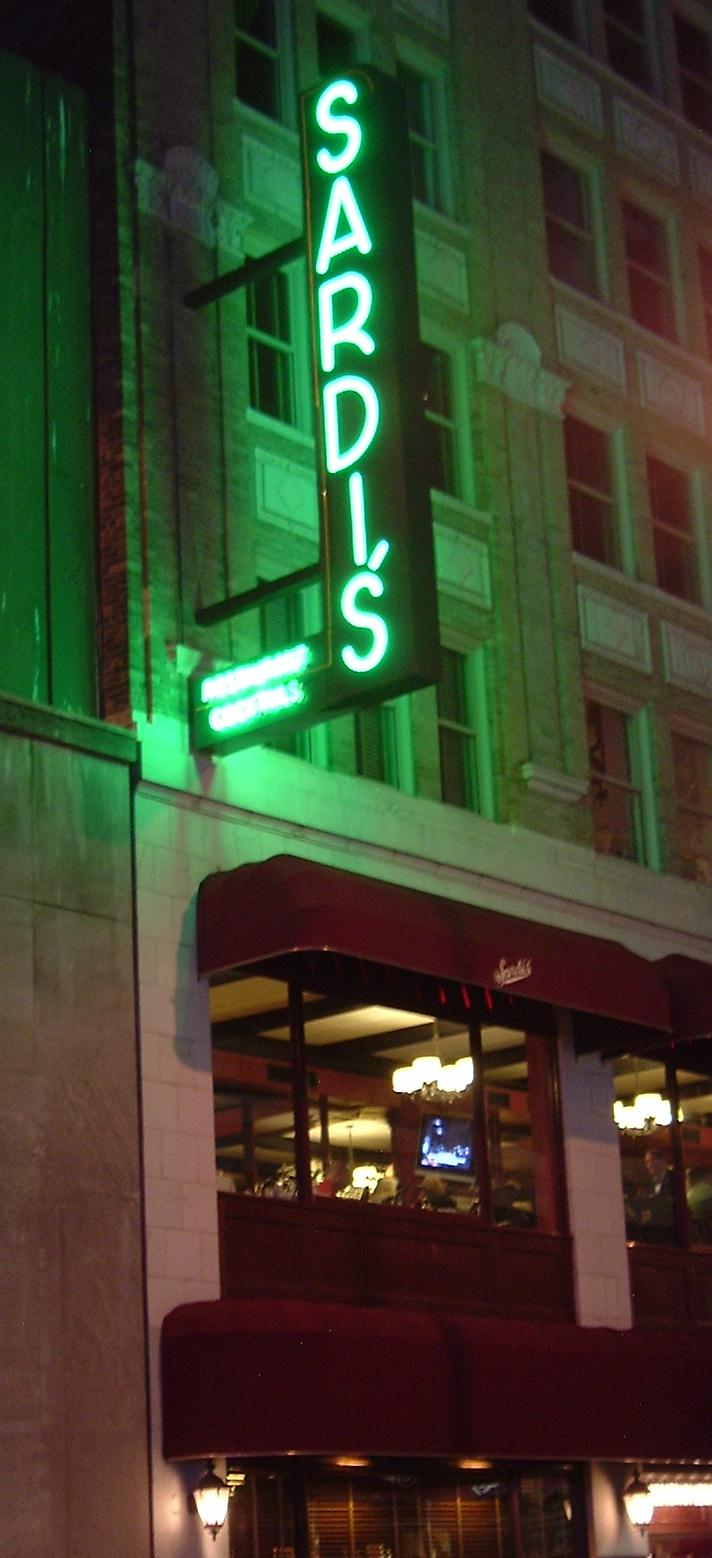
Sardi's neon sign

Frequent mentions of the restaurant in newspaper columns by Walter Winchell and Ward Morehouse added to Sardi's growing popularity. Winchell and Morehouse belonged to a group of newspapermen, press agents, and drama critics who met for lunch regularly at Sardi's and referred to themselves as the Cheese Club. Heywood Broun, Mark Hellinger, press agent Irving Hoffman, actor George Jessel, and Ring Lardner were also Cheese Club members. In fact, it was Hoffman who first brought Alex Gard to Sardi's for lunch at the Cheese Club table. Gard drew caricatures of the Cheese Club members, and Vincent Sardi hung them above their table. It was then that Sardi recalled the drawings at Zelli's and made his deal with Gard.

The restaurant became known as a pre- and post-theater hangout, as well as a location for opening night parties. Sardi's grossed about $1 million in annual revenue by the late 1950s. Vincent Sardi died in 1969, aged 83, and control of Sardi's passed to his son Vincent Jr.

=== Resales ===
The Sardi family owned the restaurant for six decades, until 1984, when Sardi's was sold to Show Biz Restaurant Inc. At the time, George Lang Corporation was planning a renovation of the restaurant in the near future. However, in June 1985, Vincent Sardi Jr. indicated that the deal had not been approved and that he still owned the restaurant; according to industry experts, he was asking for at least $7 million from a potential buyer.

Vincent Jr. sold Sardi's to Ivan Bloch, who headed Sardi's Inc., in September 1986, after which Vincent Jr. moved to Vermont. Bloch then began raising $10 million to renovate Sardi's, and Sam Lopata was hired to redesign the restaurant, a project that was supposed to have taken two months. After Bloch failed to make payments and defaulted in April 1989, his debt was restructured. Ownership was transferred to Broadway Holdings Inc., which acquired Sardi's Inc. Paul Lapides of Broadway Holdings Inc. announced plans to sell $7.8 million of stock to small investors.

When the owners defaulted again in June 1989, Sardi's filed for bankruptcy, and Vincent Sardi Jr. filed to take back ownership of the restaurant. The restaurant temporarily closed in June 1990 and reopened in November 1990 with new staff. Max Klimavicius became the restaurant's manager after it reopened. Vincent Jr. recalled that the restaurant was in poor condition; the ceiling was leaking, and patrons had to use styrofoam cups. The restaurant's revenue declined because many of its longtime customers had relocated elsewhere, as well as increased Broadway ticket prices and decreases in the number of active Broadway shows. Over the next two years, he spent $500,000 on renovations to entice customers to eat there. He restored the restaurant's original design and added a banquet hall on the third floor and a dining space on the fourth floor. These renovations increased the restaurant's capacity to 800, including 300 within the first-floor dining room.

In 2026, Klimavicius announced that he would sell the restaurant to the Shubert Organization and would retire on June 24. The Shubert Organization closed Sardi's for renovation on June 24.

== Today ==
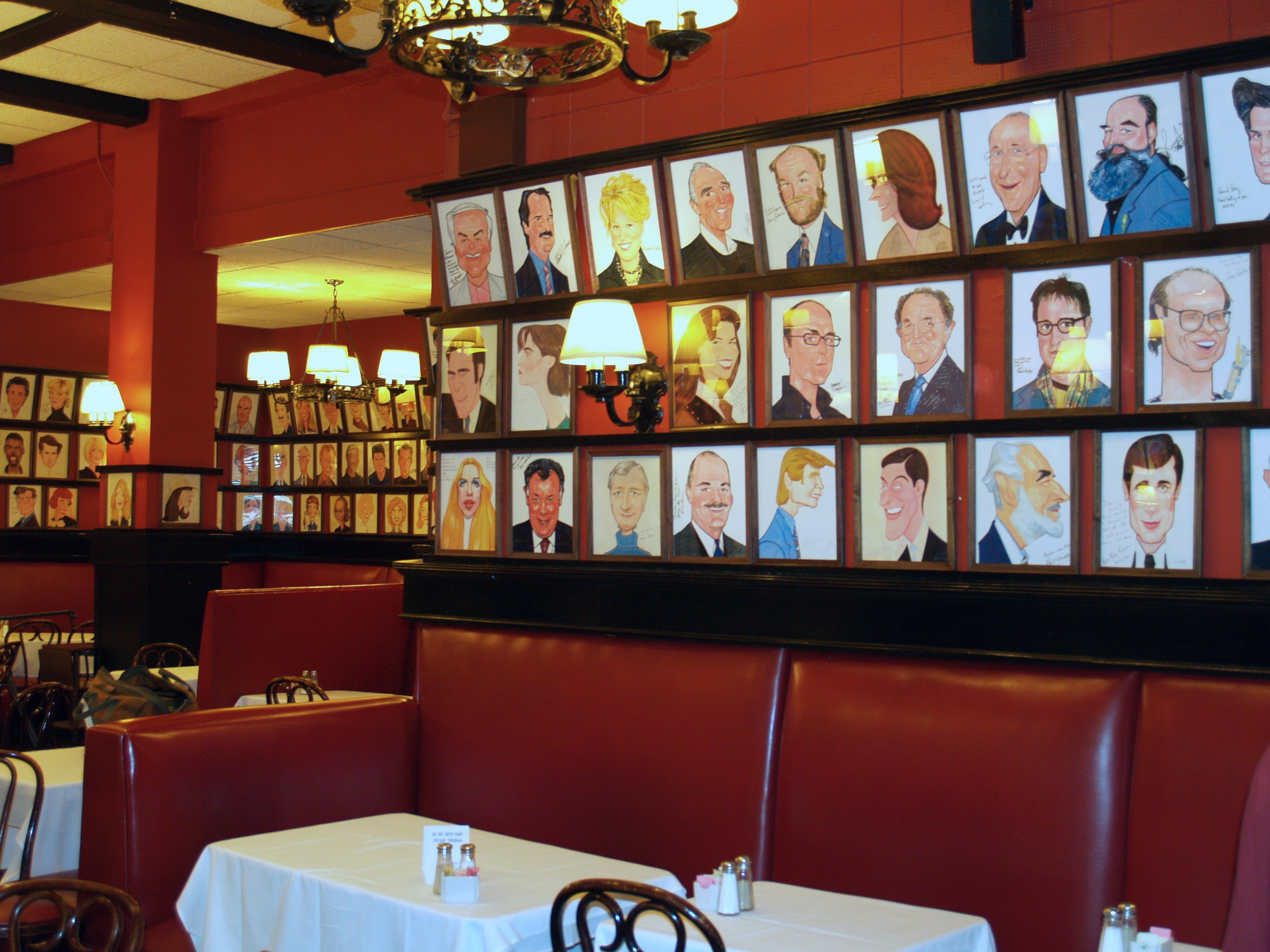
The first-floor dining room, with celebrity caricatures lining the upper walls

In part because of its location in the Theater District, the restaurant is a popular meeting spot among those in the Broadway community. Sardi's is the birthplace of the Tony Awards; after Antoinette Perry's death in 1946, her partner, theatrical producer and director Brock Pemberton came up with the idea of a theater award to be given in Perry's honor while eating there. For many years Sardi's was the location where Tony Award nominations were announced. Vincent Sardi Sr. received a special Tony Award in 1947, the first year of the awards, for "providing a transient home and comfort station for theatre folk at Sardi's for 20 years." In 2004, Vincent Sardi Jr. received a Tony Honor for Excellence in the Theatre. Sardi's is also the venue for the presentation of the Outer Critics Circle Awards and other Broadway-related events.

In a 2000 interview, composer Stephen Sondheim cited Sardi's while lamenting the changing climate of New York theater. Asked about the Broadway community, Sondheim replied, "There's none whatsoever. The writers write one show every two or three years. Who congregates at Sardi's? What is there to congregate about? Shows just sit in theaters and last." Sardi's closed temporarily in March 2020 due to the COVID-19 pandemic in New York City, reopening on December 25, 2021. Sardi's longtime bartender Joe Petrsoric, who had worked there since 1968, retired in 2023.

== Cuisine ==
Although the Sardi family was Italian, their restaurant's cuisine is not; rather it tends toward "English food", a Continental menu. In 1957, Vincent Sardi Jr. collaborated with Helen Bryson to compile a cookbook of Sardi's recipes. Curtain Up at Sardi's contains nearly 300 recipes ranging from a grilled cheese sandwich to a Champagne cocktail.

Under Vincent Jr.'s leadership, food reviewers started to criticize the eatery as being "sooty". Mimi Sheraton, a New York Times food writer, said in 1981 that "food, service and housekeeping at Sardi's leave almost everything to be desired". By 1987, Zagat was describing the food as "a culinary laughing stock", and one customer who was surveyed called Sardi's "the longest running gag on Broadway." The food critic Bryan Miller likened the restaurant to "a mystery, a tragedy and a comedy wrapped in one", giving Sardi's one out of four stars. Conversely, Chicago Tribune reporter Mary George Beggs wrote that "No one really goes there for the food; the menu hasn't changed in years, either." At the time, the restaurant was cited as serving "steaks, chops and a few Italian dishes, including a very good canneloni". Following the restaurant's reopening in 1990, reviews of Sardi's tended to be more positive.

== Caricatures ==

During his lifetime, Alex Gard drew over 720 caricatures for Sardi's. Gard died in 1948 after suffering a heart attack in the subway. After Gard, John Mackey took over drawing for the restaurant, but was soon replaced by Donald Bevan. Bevan, a U.S. Army Air Forces veteran and an illustrator, did the drawings for over 20 years, when he retired. He was replaced by Richard Baratz, a banknote and certificate engraver by profession, who was originally from Brooklyn and had been hired through a contest for a new caricaturist. Baratz, who lives in Pennsylvania, continues to the present day as the Sardi's caricaturist. As of 2010, there are more than 1,300 celebrity caricatures on display.

According to actor Robert Cuccioli's spokesperson Judy Katz, in an interview with Playbill: "On the day James Cagney died, his caricature was stolen from the Sardi's wall. Since then, when drawings are done, the originals go into a vault, and two copies are made. One goes to the lucky subject of the caricature, the other up on the Sardi's wall. This way, potential thieves won't have their moment."

In 1979, Vincent Sardi Jr. donated a collection of 227 caricatures from the restaurant to the Billy Rose Theatre Collection of The New York Public Library for the Performing Arts. In addition, about 300 caricatures were published in a 1989 book, Off the Wall at Sardi's.

== Radio broadcasts ==
On March 8, 1947, Vincent Sardi Jr. began a radio show broadcast live from the Sardi's dining room, called Luncheon at Sardi's. It was hosted originally by Bill Slater. Subsequent hosts were Tom Slater, Ray Heatherton and Arlene Francis. Currently, on WOR Radio, Joan Hamburg occasionally does broadcasts from Sardi's.

== Other locations ==
Several alternate locations of Sardi's have been opened over the years, but all were later closed or sold off. In 1932, Eddie Brandstatter opened a Los Angeles location on Hollywood Boulevard, where it was similarly popular with celebrities. It was destroyed in a fire in 1936. Vincent Sardi Sr. opened Sardi's East, a French-food eatery, at 123 East 54th Street in 1958. It was sold in 1968 and renamed the Jockey Club. In September 1974, Vincent Sardi Jr. opened a 700-seat dinner theater in Baldwin, Nassau County, but it closed after two years due to poor business.

== See also ==
- Blue Moon
- Breakfast in Hollywood
- Bright Lights of 1944
