= Mortimer Delano =

American aviation pioneer

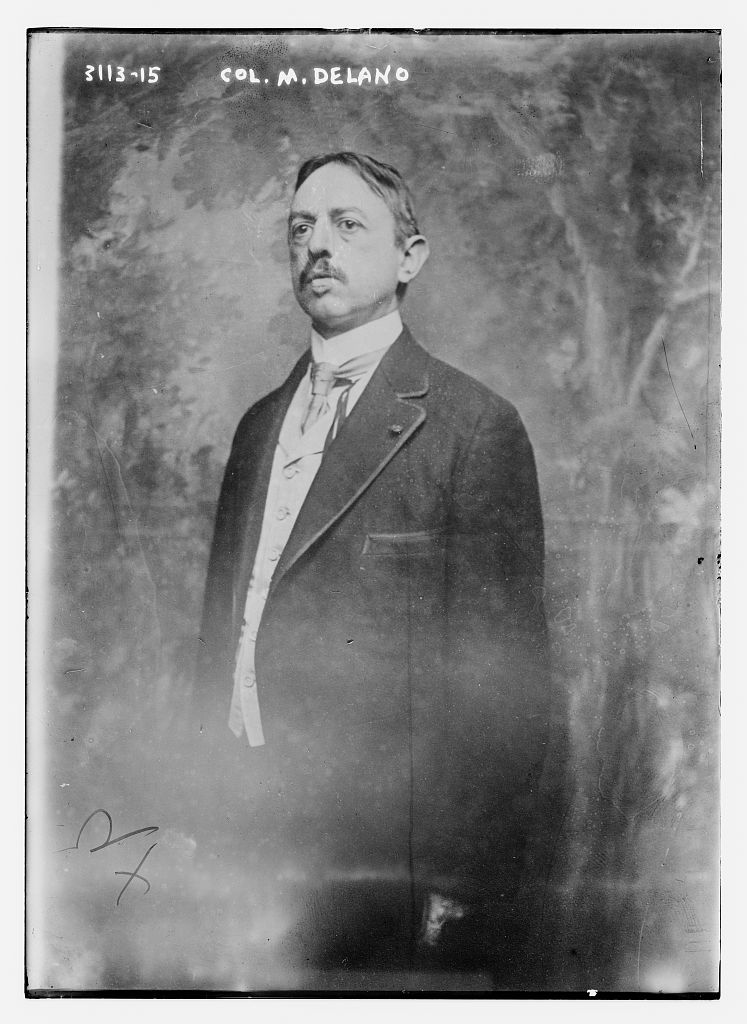
- Military career
- Allegiance: United States
- Service years: Colonel
- Commands: Aero-Military War College of America, First Aviation Corps, Aero Military Service Federation of America.

Colonel Mortimer L. Delano was head of the Aero-Military War College of America and the First Aviation Corps and The Aero Military Service Federation of America. Around 1914, he was issuing pilots licenses and selling pilots uniforms and selling military titles.

== Organizations ==
- Aero-Military War College of America
- First Aviation Corps or First Provisional Aviation Corps
- The Aero Military Service Federation of America
