= Vincent Sardi Sr. =

American restaurateur (1885–1969)

- Born: December 23, 1885
- Died: November 19, 1969 (aged 83); Essex County, New York, U.S.
- Occupation: Restaurateur
- Children: Vincent Sardi Jr.

Vincent Sardi Sr. (December 23, 1885 – November 19, 1969) was an American restaurateur. He served as founder of the restaurant Sardi's for more than 50 years. At the 1st Tony Awards, he received the Special Tony Award.

Sardi died on November 19, 1969 at the Will Rogers Memorial Hospital in Essex County, New York, at the age 83. He was buried at Flushing Cemetery.
