= Strictly Dishonorable =

Strictly Dishonorable can refer to:

- Strictly Dishonorable (play), a 1929 Broadway hit written by Preston Sturges
- Strictly Dishonorable (1931 film), the first film adaptation of the play, starring Paul Lukas and Sidney Fox
- Strictly Dishonorable (1951 film), the second film adaptation of the play, with music, starring Ezio Pinza and Janet Leigh
