= Brock Pemberton =

American theatrical producer and director

- Brock Pemberton
- Born: Ralph Brock Pemberton; December 14, 1885; Leavenworth, Kansas, U.S.
- Died: March 11, 1950 (aged 64); New York City, New York, U.S.
- Education: University of Kansas
- Alma mater: College of Emporia
- Occupations: Theatre producer; theatre director; stage actor; journalist
- Known for: Founding the Tony Awards
- Notable work: Harvey
- Spouse: Margaret McCoy (m. 1915–1950)
- Relatives: Victor Murdock (uncle)
- Awards: Special Tony Award (1950)

Brock Pemberton (December 14, 1885 – March 11, 1950) was an American theatrical producer, director and founder of the Tony Awards. He was the professional partner of Antoinette Perry, co-founder of the American Theatre Wing, and he was also a member of the Algonquin Round Table.

== Early years ==
He was born Ralph Brock Pemberton in Leavenworth, Kansas, the third of four children to Albert Pemberton and Ella Murdock. He had two older sisters and a younger brother, Murdock Pemberton, who became a writer and playwright. Pemberton's family had moved to Emporia, Kansas by 1895, where he attended Union Street School then Emporia High School. He was the valedictorian of his high school graduating class during May 1902.

== Colleges and Kansas newspaper work ==
He entered the College of Emporia on a scholarship during late summer 1902. During his sophomore year he played football and was Athletic editor of the college weekly paper. During the summer of 1904 he worked on the Coffeyville Daily Record, in Coffeyville, Kansas, a paper recently purchased by his cousin Roland Murdock. The following summer he worked on the Kansas City Globe in Kansas City, Kansas. After one term at Yale University (Note: Despite spending four years at the College of Emporia, Pemberton had not earned a degree there.) during the fall of 1906, he returned to Emporia to work on the Emporia Gazette.

The owner-editor of that newspaper, William Allen White, had previously employed Pemberton during the summer of 1906 before he left for Yale. White had gotten his start on a newspaper owned by Pemberton's maternal relatives the Murdocks, and supported the political ambitions of Pemberton's uncle Victor Murdock, owner-editor of the Wichita Eagle. By April 1907 Pemberton was enrolled in the School of Journalism at the University of Kansas, while still working for The Emporia Gazette. He pledged Phi Delta Theta fraternity (Note: William Allen White was a member of the same fraternity and a regent of the university.) upon returning to the University of Kansas in September 1907, and joined the Dramatic Club. He graduated with a Bachelor of Arts degree in June 1908.

During the next two years Pemberton worked full-time for the Emporia Gazette, becoming White's star reporter then city editor by August 1909. A long profile he wrote of the folksy poet Walt Mason was carried by newspapers across the country in early 1910. In April 1910 he left Kansas to take up what he thought was a position on The Sun in New York City.

== New York newspapers ==
Upon arriving in New York, Pemberton found out The Sun position didn't exist, but was able to get a job on the Evening Mail, reporting on harbor traffic and shipping. He later became drama critic for the Evening Mail, then assistant drama critic on the New York World, before becoming Alexander Woollcott's assistant in The New York Times drama department.

== Stage career ==
Pemberton directed and produced the American premiere of Luigi Pirandello's Six Characters in Search of an Author in 1922, as well as its first Broadway revival two years later. In 1926, he produced and directed a Sam Janney play that became the film Loose Ankles in 1930, starring a young Loretta Young and Douglas Fairbanks, Jr. In 1929 he produced and directed Preston Sturges' play Strictly Dishonorable, which was filmed twice, in 1931 and again in 1951.

Among his other productions was Miss Lulu Bett, whose writer Zona Gale became the first woman to win the Pulitzer Prize in Drama, Personal Appearance by Lawrence Riley, which was a Broadway hit and was later turned into the film Go West, Young Man and Harvey, Mary Chase's play about a man whose best friend is a large imaginary rabbit, later made into a film starring Jimmy Stewart.

Pemberton gave the Antoinette Perry Award its nickname, the Tony. As Perry's official biography at the Tony Awards website states, "At [Warner Bros. story editor] Jacob Wilk's suggestion, [Pemberton] proposed an award in her honor for distinguished stage acting and technical achievement. At the initial event in 1947, as he handed out an award, he called it a Tony. The name stuck.

From February 28, 1950 thru March 5, 1950, Pemberton played the lead in a production of Harvey at the Sombrero Playhouse in Phoenix, Arizona. Six days later he died at home from a heart attack.

Months after his death in 1950, a Tony Award was given to him posthumously in recognition of his role as the founder and the original chairman of the Tony Awards.

== Bibliography ==
- Pemberton, Brock (January 2, 1926). "A prince of Broadway". Profiles. The New Yorker. Vol. 1, no. 46. pp. 11–12.
