= Macey Harlam =

American actress

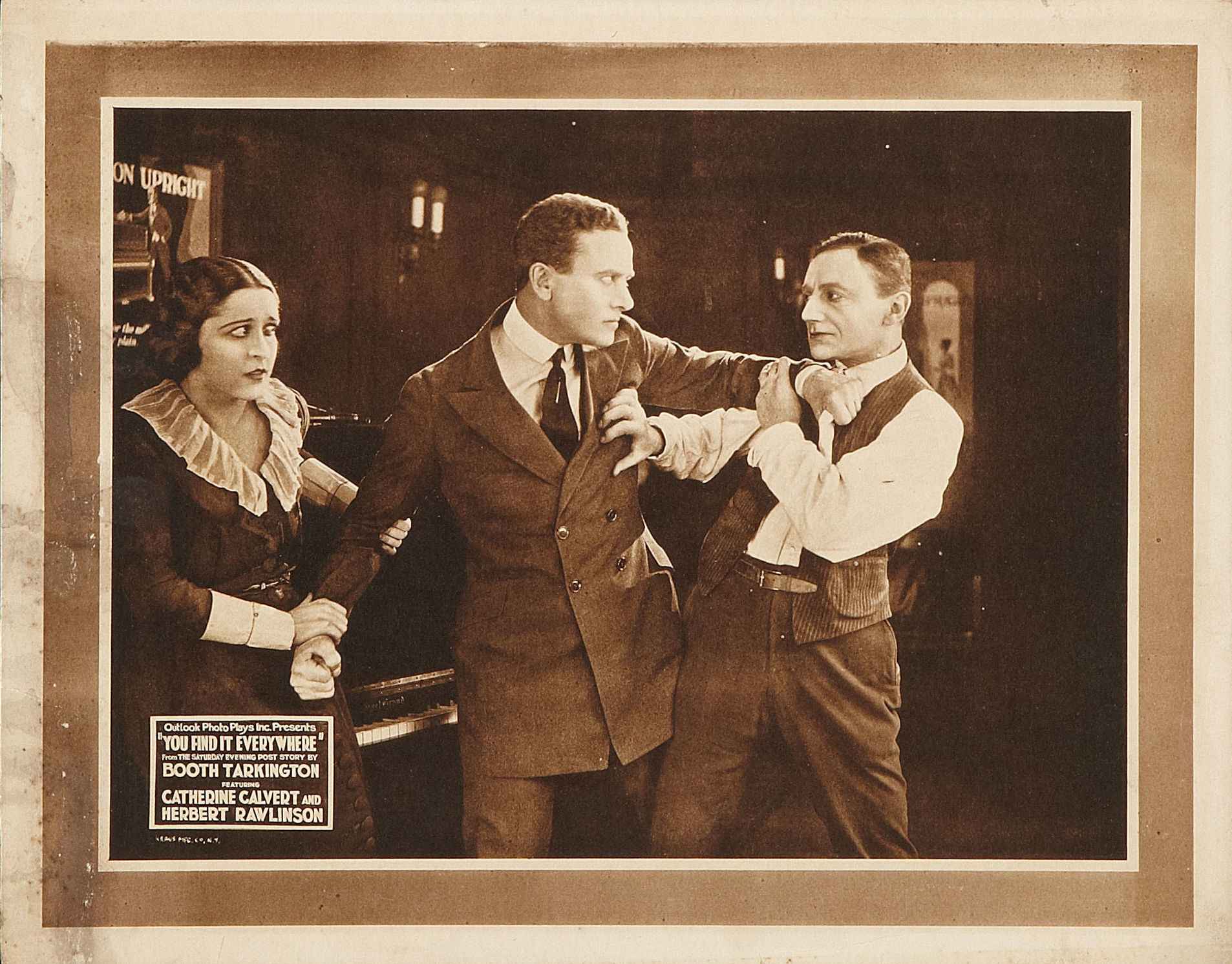
- Harlam (right) with Catherine Calvert and Herbert Rawlinson in You Find It Everywhere (1921)
- Born: April 27, 1873; New York City, New York
- Died: June 17, 1923 (aged 50); Saranac Lake, New York
- Other names: Macey Harlan; Macy Harlan; Macy Harlam
- Occupation: Actor

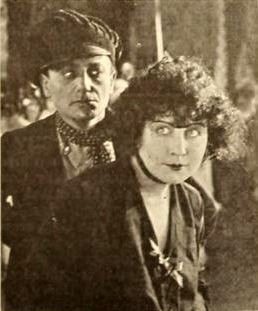
Harlam with Dorothy Dalton in L'apache, 1919

Macey Harlam (April 27, 1873 – June 17, 1923) was a stage and screen actor from New York. He performed on Broadway from 1901 to 1918 before switching to silent films. In films he appeared with Pauline Frederick, Douglas Fairbanks, Elsie Ferguson, Geraldine Farrar and Lionel Barrymore. He died at Saranac Lake, New York, in 1923.

== Selected filmography ==
- The Eternal City (1915)
- Betty of Greystone (1916)
- The Witch (1916)
- The Habit of Happiness (1916)
- The Perils of Divorce (1916)
- Manhattan Madness (1916)
- Nanette of the Wilds (1916)
- The Romantic Journey (1916)
- Barbary Sheep (1917)
- Flame of the Desert (1919)
- Toby's Bow (1919)
- The Woman and the Puppet (1920)
- The Right to Love (1920)
- The Plaything of Broadway (1921)
- After Midnight (1921)
- The Conquest of Canaan (1921)
- You Find It Everywhere (1921)
- Fair Lady (1922)
- Always the Woman (1922)
- When Knighthood Was in Flower (1922)
- The Face in the Fog (1922)
- The Tents of Allah (1923)
- Bella Donna (1923)
- Broadway Broke (1923)
