= Personal Appearance (play) =

Personal Appearance (1934) is a stage comedy by the American playwright and screenwriter Lawrence Riley (1896–1974), which was a Broadway smash and the basis for the classic Mae West film Go West, Young Man (1936).

Personal Appearance was produced by the legendary Brock Pemberton (founder of the Tony Awards) and staged by Antoinette Perry (in whose memory Pemberton named the Tonys). It opened in 1934 at New York's Henry Miller Theatre starring the famed stage and screen actress Gladys George (now remembered especially for her role as Miles Archer's spouse in the film The Maltese Falcon). Her comic performance contributed to making Personal Appearance a Broadway hit that lasted for 501 performances. It launched Riley's career as a playwright and remains his most famous play.

The New York Times characterized Personal Appearance in an October 18, 1934, review's headline as a "Satire of the Hollywood Dementia." The play is set in the Pennsylvania backcountry, where Riley was originally from and where he long resided. It is the story of a movie star and diva, Carole Arden, who is on a tour giving personal appearances to promote her latest film, Drifting Lady. Her car breaks down, which leads to her encounter with a young and handsome gas station attendant, Chester Norton, played by Philip Ober. His fiancée's parents put Arden up for the night and Arden falls for Norton. But her down-to-earth press agent, Gene Tuttle, played by Otto Hulett, foils her plans to bring Norton to Hollywood with her.

This frothy and satirical entertainment epitomizes Pemberton's productions at the time: He was among those who advocated such escapist fare as needed psychological relief during the Great Depression. This was in opposition to socially relevant stage productions, such as Marc Blitzstein's musical The Cradle Will Rock (1937). Personal Appearance's huge success only reinforced Pemberton in his opinion.

In 1935, Samuel French (the English-speaking world's leading theatrical publisher) produced both a hardcover and a softcover edition of Personal Appearance: a New Comedy in Three Acts in Los Angeles and New York.

Personal Appearance was adapted for the screen by Mae West as Go West, Young Man. It was directed by Henry Hathaway and released by Paramount in 1936. In it, West reprises George's role but with a more callous and cynical slant. It was one of the rare instances, perhaps the first, in which West starred in a role not originally conceived for her. After launching Randolph Scott's career as a cowboy star four years earlier in Heritage of the Desert, Hathaway cast him uncharacteristically as West's love interest in Go West, Young Man. The film's success led to Riley's second successful career as a screenwriter—a somewhat ironical outcome, given Personal Appearance's criticism of Hollywood.
