= Antoinette Perry =

American actress and director (1888–1946)

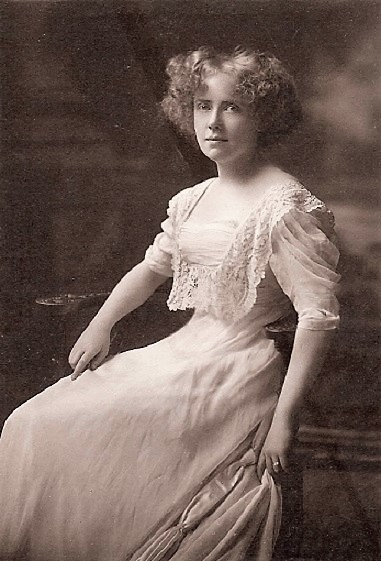
- c. 1910
- Born: Mary Antoinette Perry; June 27, 1888; Denver, Colorado, U.S.
- Died: June 28, 1946 (aged 58); New York City, U.S.
- Occupations: Actress, theatre producer and director and co-founder of the American Theatre Wing
- Spouse: Frank W. Frueauff (1909–1922)

Mary Antoinette "Tony" Perry (June 27, 1888 – June 28, 1946) was an American actress, producer, director and administrator known for her work in theatre. She was co-founder and secretary of the American Theatre Wing and is the eponym of the Tony Awards, presented by that organization for excellence in Broadway theatre.

== Life and career ==
=== Early years ===
Born in Denver, Colorado, she spent her childhood aspiring to replicate the thespian artistry of her aunt and uncle, Mildred Hall and George Wessels, who were both well-respected touring actors. She performed at the Elitch Theater near Denver when she was only 11 years old. In her biography, Mary Elitch recalled, "Her first public appearance was at the age of eleven in a small part on my stage. Today, with a brilliant career as an actress behind her, having played leading women with such great actors as David Warfield, Antoinette is a successful producer in New York City – having her own theatre."

Perry's father, William Perry, was opposed to his daughter becoming an actress, but he was not against her pursuing a career in music, so sent her to Miss Ely's School in New York to study voice and piano.

Perry made her actual stage debut at Elitch Theatre "on June 12, 1904 in Olympe as the 'Fifth Actress'." In June 1905 she made her Chicago debut in Mrs. Temple's Telegram and one year later she appeared in the same play in her New York debut.

In 1906 David Warfield discovered her, and she remained with his company as leading lady until 1909. Perry was able to return to her hometown theatre in Denver during the 1908 Elitch Theatre season with David Warfield, Marie Bates, William Elliot and others in the preseason special productions of The Music Master and David Belasco's The Grand Army Man.

She appeared opposite David Warfield in Music Master in 1906 when she was only 18.

Her career was on the rise, yet she left the stage a star in 1909, to marry Denver businessman and president of the Denver Gas and Electric Company, Frank W. Frueauff.

=== Career ===
Following Frank Frueauff's death in 1922 of a heart attack, Perry returned to the stage. In 1924 she appeared in Zona Gale's Mr. Pitt. She appeared notably in George S. Kaufman and Edna Ferber's Minick that same year. She took up directing in 1928. In partnership with Brock Pemberton she produced several successful plays, including: Divorce Me Dear, Ceiling Zero, Red Harvest, Strictly Dishonorable, Personal Appearance (Lawrence Riley's breakthrough hit), Kiss the Boys Goodbye, and Janie. Their most famous production was probably the Pulitzer Prize-winning Mary Chase classic Harvey, which Perry directed and which enjoyed enormous success on Broadway and as a film starring James Stewart. According to Ellis Nassour:

Perry became a stage director at a time when women working offstage in the theater were often relegated to positions as costumers or dressers. She established herself as a director with Preston Sturges in "Strictly Dishonorable" in 1929, in which her daughter Margaret debuted. “Tony was a gifted and versatile actress, and one of the best directors the American theater has produced,” noted Helen Hayes.

=== Personal life and death ===
Perry had three daughters.

Perry was a devout Christian Scientist. Despite signs of heart disease, she refused to see a doctor. The day after her 58th birthday, on June 28, 1946, she died of a heart attack. She is buried at Woodlawn Cemetery in the Bronx, New York City.

== Legacy ==
Perry helped found, and was chairwoman and secretary of, the American Theatre Wing (ATW), which operated the Stage Door Canteens during World War II, providing entertainment to servicemen in several American cities. After her death, her friends and colleagues took action to memorialize her contribution to the high standards of American theatre. Brock Pemberton suggested that the ATW create a series of awards to be given in her honor. Since 1947, the Antoinette Perry Awards for Excellence in Broadway Theatre have been given annually for distinguished achievement in theatre, and are one of the theatre world's most coveted honors. They are universally known by their nickname, the Tony Awards. Fellow ATW co-founder and Perry's close friend Louise Heims Beck was responsible for overseeing the organization of the 1st Tony Awards.

In 2011 Perry was featured as an historical figure when The Neo-Futurists devised a show about the longest-running failure in Broadway history, J. Frank Davis' The Ladder. The Neo-Futurist show was called Chalk & Saltwater: The Ladder Project. Chalk & Saltwater explored the individuals involved in the failed show this included Edgar B. Davis, the play's backer and "angel", Brock and Murdock Pemberton, and J. Frank Davis and their lives before and after The Ladder's 789-performance run. Perry was a member of the original cast of The Ladder, but left the production prior to its close.

Perry was inducted into the Colorado Women's Hall of Fame in 2004.
