= List of Tony Awards ceremonies =

This is a list of Tony Awards ceremonies.

This list is current as of the 79th Tony Awards ceremony held on June 7, 2026.

== Venues ==
- 1947–1953, 1957–1959, 1961, 1962: Waldorf-Astoria Hotel (12)
- 1954–1956: Plaza Hotel (3)
- 1960, 1965: Astor Hotel (2)
- 1963: Hotel Americana (1)
- 1964: New York Hilton (1)
- 1966: Rockefeller Center Rainbow Room (1)
- 1967, 1968, 1974, 1976–1979, 1985: Shubert Theatre (8)
- 1969, 1970, 1980, 1981, 1987: Mark Hellinger Theatre (5)
- 1971: Palace Theatre (1)
- 1972: Broadway Theatre (1)
- 1973, 1982: Imperial Theatre (2)
- 1975, 2021: Winter Garden Theatre (2)
- 1983, 1984, 1992–1994, 1999: Gershwin Theatre (6)
- 1986, 1988, 1991, 1995: Minskoff Theatre (4)
- 1989, 1990: Lunt-Fontanne Theatre (2)
- 1996: Majestic Theatre (1)
- 1997, 1998, 2000–2010, 2013–2015, 2017–2019, 2022, 2025–2026: Radio City Music Hall (22)
- 2011, 2012, 2016: Beacon Theatre (3)
- 2023: United Palace (1)
- 2024: David H. Koch Theater (1)

== Networks ==
U.S. network	Years
WCBS	1959–1962
WOR-TV	1963–1965
ABC	1967
NBC	1968–1970
ABC	1971–1977
CBS	1978–present
Paramount+	2021–present

== Ceremonies ==
Ceremony	Date	Best Musical	Best Play	Host(s)	Location	Network(s)	U.S. viewers (millions)
1st	April 6, 1947	—N/a	—N/a	Brock Pemberton	Waldorf Astoria New York	WOR, Mutual	
2nd	March 28, 1948	—N/a	Mister Roberts	Bert Lytell, Hiram Sherman, Harry Hirshfield	Waldorf Astoria New York	WOR, Mutual	
3rd	April 24, 1949	Kiss Me, Kate	Death of a Salesman	Brock Pemberton, James Sauter	Waldorf Astoria New York	WOR, Mutual	
4th	April 9, 1950	South Pacific	The Cocktail Party	no formal host	Waldorf Astoria New York	WOR, Mutual	
5th	March 25, 1951	Guys and Dolls	The Rose Tattoo	James Sauter	Waldorf Astoria New York	WOR, Mutual	
6th	March 30, 1952	The King and I	The Fourposter	Helen Hayes	Waldorf Astoria New York	WOR, Mutual	
7th	March 29, 1953	Wonderful Town	The Crucible	Faye Emerson	Waldorf Astoria New York	NBC radio	
8th	March 28, 1954	Kismet	The Teahouse of the August Moon	James Sauter	Plaza Hotel	NBC	
9th	March 27, 1955	The Pajama Game	The Desperate Hours	Helen Hayes	Plaza Hotel	NBC	
10th	April 1, 1956	Damn Yankees	The Diary of Anne Frank	Jack Carter	Plaza Hotel	DuMont	
11th	April 21, 1957	My Fair Lady	Long Day's Journey into Night	Bud Collyer	Waldorf Astoria New York	none	
12th	April 13, 1958	The Music Man	Sunrise at Campobello	Bud Collyer	Waldorf Astoria New York	none	
13th	April 12, 1959	Redhead	J.B.	Bud Collyer	Waldorf Astoria New York	WCBS-TV	
14th	April 24, 1960	Fiorello! / The Sound of Music	The Miracle Worker	Eddie Albert	Hotel Astor	WCBS-TV	
15th	April 16, 1961	Bye Bye Birdie	Becket	Phil Silvers	Waldorf Astoria New York	WCBS-TV	
16th	April 29, 1962	How to Succeed in Business Without Really Trying	A Man for All Seasons	Ray Bolger, Robert Preston	Waldorf Astoria New York	WCBS-TV	
17th	April 28, 1963	A Funny Thing Happened on the Way to the Forum	Who's Afraid of Virginia Woolf?	Abe Burrows, Robert Morse	Hotel Americana	WWOR-TV	
18th	May 24, 1964	Hello, Dolly!	Luther	Sidney Blackmer	New York Hilton Midtown	WWOR-TV	
19th	June 13, 1965	Fiddler on the Roof	The Subject Was Roses	Tom Bosley, José Ferrer, Van Johnson	Hotel Astor	WWOR-TV	
20th	June 16, 1966	Man of La Mancha	Marat/Sade	George Abbott, Ginger Rogers	Rainbow Room, Rockefeller Center	CBS (radio)	
21st	March 26, 1967	Cabaret	The Homecoming	Mary Martin, Robert Preston	Shubert Theatre	ABC	
22nd	April 21, 1968	Hallelujah, Baby!	Rosencrantz and Guildenstern Are Dead	Angela Lansbury, Peter Ustinov	Shubert Theatre	NBC	
23rd	April 20, 1969	1776	The Great White Hope	Diahann Carroll, Alan King	Mark Hellinger Theatre	NBC	
24th	April 19, 1970	Applause	Borstal Boy	Julie Andrews, Shirley MacLaine, Walter Matthau	Mark Hellinger Theatre	NBC	
25th	March 28, 1971	Company	Sleuth	Lauren Bacall, Angela Lansbury, Anthony Quayle, Anthony Quinn	Palace Theatre	ABC	
26th	April 23, 1972	Two Gentlemen of Verona	Sticks and Bones	Henry Fonda, Deborah Kerr, Peter Ustinov	The Broadway Theatre	ABC	
27th	March 25, 1973	A Little Night Music	That Championship Season	Rex Harrison, Celeste Holm	Imperial Theatre	ABC	
28th	April 21, 1974	Raisin	The River Niger	Peter Falk, Florence Henderson, Robert Preston, Cicely Tyson	Shubert Theatre	ABC	20.0
29th	April 20, 1975	The Wiz	Equus	Larry Blyden, George S. Irving, Larry Kert, Carol Lawrence, Michele Lee, Bernadette Peters, Bobby Van	Winter Garden Theatre	ABC	17.9
30th	April 18, 1976	A Chorus Line	Travesties	Eddie Albert, Richard Burton, Jane Fonda, Diana Rigg, George C. Scott, Trish Van Devere	Shubert Theatre	ABC	16.0
31st	June 5, 1977	Annie	The Shadow Box	Jack Albertson, Bea Arthur, Buddy Ebsen, Damon Evans, Jean Stapleton, Leslie Uggams	Shubert Theatre	ABC	
32nd	June 4, 1978	Ain't Misbehavin'	Da	no formal host	Shubert Theatre	CBS	
33rd	June 3, 1979	Sweeney Todd: The Demon Barber of Fleet Street	The Elephant Man	Jane Alexander, Henry Fonda, Liv Ullmann	Shubert Theatre	CBS	
34th	June 8, 1980	Evita	Children of a Lesser God	Mary Tyler Moore, Jason Robards	Mark Hellinger Theatre	CBS	
35th	June 7, 1981	42nd Street	Amadeus	Ellen Burstyn, Richard Chamberlain	Mark Hellinger Theatre	CBS	
36th	June 6, 1982	Nine	The Life and Adventures of Nicholas Nickleby	Tony Randall	Imperial Theatre	CBS	
37th	June 5, 1983	Cats	Torch Song Trilogy	Richard Burton, Lena Horne, Jack Lemmon	Gershwin Theatre	CBS	
38th	June 3, 1984	La Cage aux Folles	The Real Thing	Julie Andrews, Robert Preston	Gershwin Theatre	CBS	
39th	June 2, 1985	Big River	Biloxi Blues	no formal host	Shubert Theatre	CBS	
40th	June 1, 1986	The Mystery of Edwin Drood	I'm Not Rappaport	no formal host	Minskoff Theatre	CBS	
41st	June 7, 1987	Les Misérables	Fences	Angela Lansbury	Mark Hellinger Theatre	CBS	
42nd	June 5, 1988	The Phantom of the Opera	M. Butterfly	Angela Lansbury	Minskoff Theatre	CBS	12.1
43rd	June 4, 1989	Jerome Robbins' Broadway	The Heidi Chronicles	Angela Lansbury	Lunt-Fontanne Theatre	CBS	12.3
44th	June 3, 1990	City of Angels	The Grapes of Wrath	Kathleen Turner	Lunt-Fontanne Theatre	CBS	10.1
45th	June 2, 1991	The Will Rogers Follies	Lost in Yonkers	Julie Andrews, Jeremy Irons	Minskoff Theatre	CBS	12.2
46th	May 31, 1992	Crazy for You	Dancing at Lughnasa	Glenn Close	Gershwin Theatre	CBS	11.7
47th	June 6, 1993	Kiss of the Spider Woman	Angels in America: Millennium Approaches	Liza Minnelli	Gershwin Theatre	CBS	11.1
48th	June 12, 1994	Passion	Angels in America: Perestroika	Anthony Hopkins, Amy Irving	Gershwin Theatre	CBS	10.4
49th	June 4, 1995	Sunset Boulevard	Love! Valour! Compassion!	Nathan Lane, Glenn Close, Gregory Hines	Minskoff Theatre	CBS	10.2
50th	June 2, 1996	Rent	Master Class	Nathan Lane	Majestic Theatre	CBS	8.7
51st	June 1, 1997	Titanic	The Last Night of Ballyhoo	Rosie O'Donnell	Radio City Music Hall	CBS	13.0
52nd	June 7, 1998	The Lion King	Art	Rosie O'Donnell	Radio City Music Hall	CBS	11.7
53rd	June 6, 1999	Fosse	Side Man	no formal host	Gershwin Theatre	CBS	9.1
54th	June 4, 2000	Contact	Copenhagen	Rosie O'Donnell, Nathan Lane	Radio City Music Hall	CBS	8.5
55th	June 3, 2001	The Producers	Proof	Nathan Lane, Matthew Broderick	Radio City Music Hall	CBS	8.9
56th	June 2, 2002	Thoroughly Modern Millie	The Goat, or Who Is Sylvia?	Bernadette Peters, Gregory Hines	Radio City Music Hall	CBS	7.9
57th	June 8, 2003	Hairspray	Take Me Out	Hugh Jackman	Radio City Music Hall	CBS	7.8
58th	June 6, 2004	Avenue Q	I Am My Own Wife	Hugh Jackman	Radio City Music Hall	CBS	6.4
59th	June 5, 2005	Monty Python's Spamalot	Doubt	Hugh Jackman	Radio City Music Hall	CBS	6.5
60th	June 11, 2006	Jersey Boys	The History Boys	no formal host	Radio City Music Hall	CBS	7.7
61st	June 10, 2007	Spring Awakening	The Coast of Utopia	no formal host	Radio City Music Hall	CBS	5.7
62nd	June 15, 2008	In the Heights	August: Osage County	Whoopi Goldberg	Radio City Music Hall	CBS	6.2
63rd	June 7, 2009	Billy Elliot the Musical	God of Carnage	Neil Patrick Harris	Radio City Music Hall	CBS	7.4
64th	June 13, 2010	Memphis	Red	Sean Hayes	Radio City Music Hall	CBS	7.0
65th	June 12, 2011	The Book of Mormon	War Horse	Neil Patrick Harris	Beacon Theatre	CBS	6.9
66th	June 10, 2012	Once	Clybourne Park	Neil Patrick Harris	Beacon Theatre	CBS	6.0
67th	June 9, 2013	Kinky Boots	Vanya and Sonia and Masha and Spike	Neil Patrick Harris	Radio City Music Hall	CBS	7.2
68th	June 8, 2014	A Gentleman's Guide to Love and Murder	All the Way	Hugh Jackman	Radio City Music Hall	CBS	7.0
69th	June 7, 2015	Fun Home	The Curious Incident of the Dog in the Night-Time	Kristin Chenoweth, Alan Cumming	Radio City Music Hall	CBS	6.4
70th	June 12, 2016	Hamilton	The Humans	James Corden	Beacon Theatre	CBS	8.7
71st	June 11, 2017	Dear Evan Hansen	Oslo	Kevin Spacey	Radio City Music Hall	CBS	6.0
72nd	June 10, 2018	The Band's Visit	Harry Potter and the Cursed Child	Sara Bareilles, Josh Groban	Radio City Music Hall	CBS	6.3
73rd	June 9, 2019	Hadestown	The Ferryman	James Corden	Radio City Music Hall	CBS	5.4
74th	September 26, 2021	Moulin Rouge!	The Inheritance	Audra McDonald (ceremony); Leslie Odom Jr. (Broadway's Back!)	Winter Garden Theatre	CBS/Paramount+	2.8
75th	June 12, 2022	A Strange Loop	The Lehman Trilogy	Ariana DeBose	Radio City Music Hall	CBS/Paramount+	3.9
76th	June 11, 2023	Kimberly Akimbo	Leopoldstadt	Ariana DeBose	United Palace	CBS/Paramount+	4.3
77th	June 16, 2024	The Outsiders	Stereophonic	Ariana DeBose	David H. Koch Theater	CBS/Paramount+	3.5
78th	June 8, 2025	Maybe Happy Ending	Purpose	Cynthia Erivo	Radio City Music Hall	CBS/Paramount+	4.9
79th	June 7, 2026	Schmigadoon!	Liberation	P!nk	Radio City Music Hall	CBS/Paramount+	4.7
80th	June 13, 2027	TBA	TBA	TBA	Radio City Music Hall	CBS/Paramount+	TBA

== Multiple ceremonies hosted ==
The following individuals have hosted (or co-hosted) the Tony Awards ceremony on two or more occasions.

Host	Number of Ceremonies
Angela Lansbury	5
Neil Patrick Harris	4
Hugh Jackman	4
Nathan Lane	4
Robert Preston	4
Julie Andrews	3
Bud Collyer	3
Ariana DeBose	3
Rosie O'Donnell	3
James Sauter	3
Eddie Albert	2
Richard Burton	2
Glenn Close	2
James Corden	2
Henry Fonda	2
Helen Hayes	2
Gregory Hines	2
Brock Pemberton	2
Bernadette Peters	2
Peter Ustinov	2

== See also ==
- Broadway theatre
- Drama Desk Awards
- Outer Critics Circle Awards
- Laurence Olivier Awards
- Timeline of New York City
- List of the longest-running Broadway shows
- List of the longest-running West End shows
