= Marriage of Convenience =

Marriage of Convenience may refer to:

- Marriage of convenience
- Marriage of Convenience (1966 film), a Polish musical comedy
- Marriage of Convenience (1960 film), a British crime film

== See also ==
- Marriage for Convenience a 1919 silent film drama
