= Go West, Young Man (1936 film) =

1936 film by Henry Hathaway

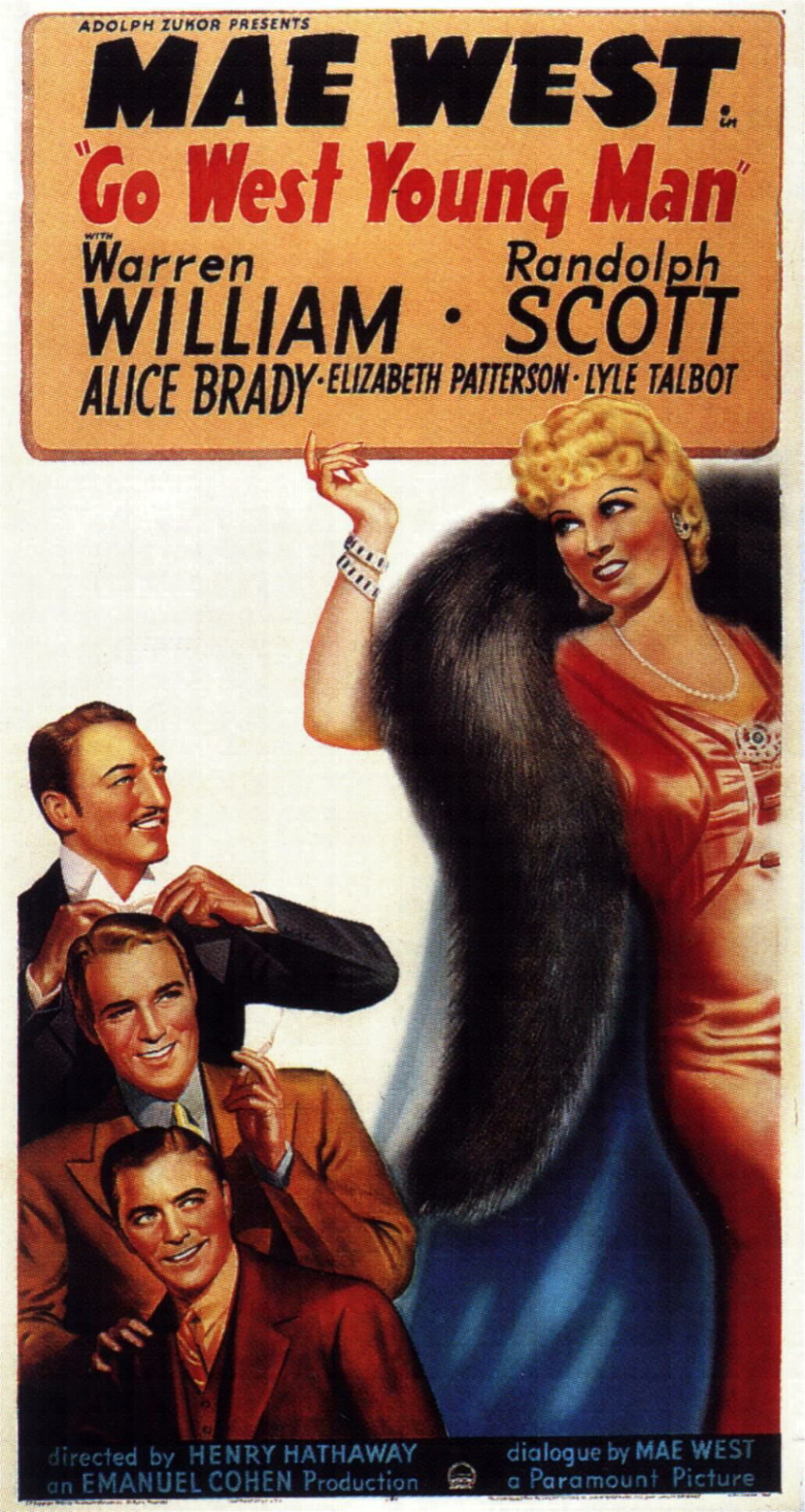
- Theatrical release poster
- Directed by: Henry Hathaway
- Screenplay by: Mae West
- Based on: Personal Appearance (play) by Lawrence Riley
- Produced by: Emanuel Cohen
- Starring: Mae West; Warren William; Randolph Scott
- Cinematography: Karl Struss
- Edited by: Ray Curtiss
- Music by: Arthur Johnston
- Production company: Emanuel Cohen Productions
- Distributed by: Paramount Pictures
- Release date: November 13, 1936 (USA)
- Running time: 82 minutes
- Country: United States
- Language: English

Go West, Young Man is a 1936 American comedy film directed by Henry Hathaway and starring Mae West, Warren William and Randolph Scott. Released by Paramount Pictures and based on the 1934 play Personal Appearance by Lawrence Riley, the film is about a movie star who is stranded in the country and trifles with a young man's affections. The phrase "Go West, young man" is often attributed to New York Tribune founder Horace Greeley, and sometimes misattributed to Indiana journalist John B. L. Soule, but the latest research shows it to be a paraphrase.

== Plot ==
Mavis Arden is a movie star who becomes romantically involved with a politician. She plans to meet him at her next tour stop, but her Rolls-Royce malfunctions and she is left stranded in a rural town. Her manager arranges for her to stay at a local boarding house. She sets her eyes on the young mechanic fixing her car, Bud Norton.

== Cast ==
- Mae West as Mavis Arden
- Warren William as Morgan
- Randolph Scott as Bud Norton
- Alice Brady as Mrs. Struthers
- Elizabeth Patterson as Aunt Kate Barnaby
- Lyle Talbot as Francis X. Harrigan
- Isabel Jewell as Gladys
- Margaret Perry as Joyce Struthers
- Etienne Girardot as Prof. Herbert Rigby
- Maynard Holmes as Clyde
- John Indrisano as Chauffeur
- Alyce Ardell as Jeanette (French maid)
- Nick Stewart as Nicodemus
- Charles Irwin as Master of Ceremonies
- Walter Walker as Andy Kelton
- Raquel Torres as Rico's girlfriend

== Reception ==
The New York Times wrote that the film had "lost little" from the play and called the supporting cast "uniformly excellent." Variety wrote that "Miss West, in her own way, is excellent" even though her persona "tires a bit and no longer is quite the novelty it once was." "Excellent Mae West vehicle filled with laughs", reported Film Daily. Motion Picture Daily wrote that "the film is basically farce comedy and, while noticeably different from previous West features, it does not fail to deliver all that is expected." "The play was funny and tough; and the movie is funny, and perhaps tough too", wrote John Mosher in The New Yorker. "We mustn't, of course, ever allow anything to curb Mae West, so it is with relief that we find her in this film no more shy than before." Writing for The Spectator, Graham Greene gave the film a poor review, characterizing it as "quite incredibly tedious", and "as slow and wobbling in its pace as Miss West's famous walk".
