= John Soule =

John Soule may refer to:

- John B. L. Soule (1815–1891), American poet, preacher, and newspaperman, active in Indiana and Illinois
- John P. Soule (1828–1904), American photographer and publisher, active in Massachusetts and Washington state
