= William Ricciardi =

Italian actor

- Born: 12 July 1871; Sorrento, Campania, Italy
- Died: 16 February 1961 (aged 89); Naples, Italy
- Occupation: Actor
- Years active: 1922–1937

William Ricciardi (12 July 1871 – 16 February 1961) was an Italian actor known for his role as Signor Baldini in San Francisco (1936). He also appeared in the Phil Rosen film The Heart of a Siren (1926). In Anthony Adverse (1936) he had a splendid cameo as the talkative coachman who converses with Adverse, played by Fredric March.

William Ricciardi and Francesco Saverio were introduced by the actor Francesco De Maio and in 1889 they decided to initiate their own theatre circle. Tony Perry thought of Ricciardi for Tom in Child of Manhattan.

He also played stage roles in The Great Lover as Farnald. He played Joe Malatesta in Mr. Malatesta for 97 performances. Tomasso was performed in Strictly Dishonourable (1929) 557 times.

== Filmography ==
- That Woman (1922) as Morris Elman
- The Eternal City (1923) as Auctioneer
- The Humming Bird (1924) as Papa Jacques
- The Side Show of Life (1924) as Mignon
- Greater Than Marriage (1924) as Sam Goldman
- A Man Must Live (1925) as Cabaret Owner
- The Heart of a Siren (1925) as Emilio - Isabella's Uncle
- Say It Again (1926) as Prime Minister Stemmler
- Puppets (1926) as Sandro
- Strictly Dishonorable (1931) as Tomasso
- As You Desire Me (1932) as Pietro
- Crooner (1932) as Antoine - Headwaiter (uncredited)
- Tiger Shark (1932) as Manuel Silva
- Scarlet Dawn (1932) as Kitchen Boss (uncredited)
- The Scoundrel (1935) as Luigi
- Stars Over Broadway (1935) as Minotti
- Under Two Flags (1936) as Cigarette's Father
- San Francisco (1936) as Signor Baldini
- Anthony Adverse (1936) as Coachman to Leghorn
- Man of the People (1937) as 'Pop' Rossetti
