= That Woman (1922 film) =

1922 film

- Directed by: Harry O. Hoyt
- Written by: Wallace Clifton; Sabin Wood
- Starring: Catherine Calvert; William Black; William Ricciardi
- Production company: F.C. Mims Productions
- Distributed by: American Releasing Corporation
- Release date: December 31, 1922
- Running time: 60 minutes
- Country: United States
- Languages: Silent; English intertitles

That Woman is a lost 1922 American silent drama film directed by Harry O. Hoyt and starring Catherine Calvert, William Black and William Ricciardi.

== Synopsis ==
When the a star Broadway actress marries the son of a wealthy New York family, his father does everything he can to try and split the couple up. Eventually convinced of her worthiness, he changes his mind and gives them his blessing.

== Cast ==
- Catherine Calvert as Adora Winstanley
- Joseph Bruelle as William Arnold Kelvin
- William Black as William Kelvin
- George Pauncefort as Somerton Randall
- William Ricciardi as Morris Elman
- Jack Newton as Hilary Weston
- Norbert Wicki as Mishu
- Grace Field
- Guy Coombs
- Ralph Bunker

== Preservation ==
With no holdings located in archives, That Woman is considered a lost film.

== Bibliography ==
- Munden, Kenneth White. The American Film Institute Catalog of Motion Pictures Produced in the United States, Part 1. University of California Press, 1997.
