= The Romantic Journey =

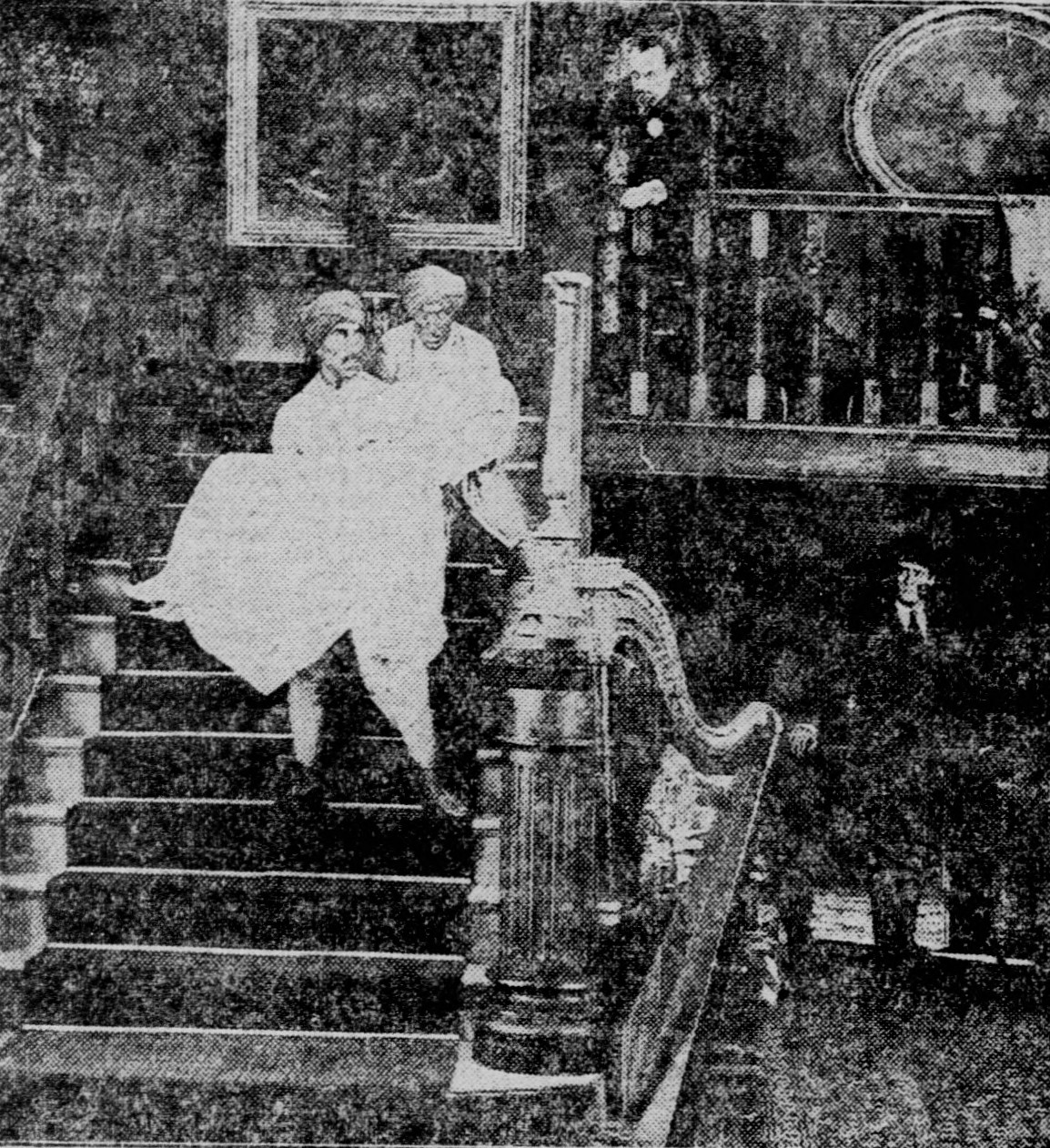
- Scene from the film
- Directed by: George Fitzmaurice
- Written by: Ouida Bergère
- Produced by: Louis Gasnier
- Starring: William Courtenay; Macey Harlam; Alice Dovey
- Cinematography: Arthur C. Miller; Harold Louis Miller
- Production company: Astra Film
- Distributed by: Pathé Exchange
- Release date: December 24, 1916
- Running time: 50 minutes
- Country: United States
- Languages: Silent; English intertitles

The Romantic Journey is a 1916 American silent drama film directed by George Fitzmaurice and starring William Courtenay, Macey Harlam and Alice Dovey.

== Cast ==
- William Courtenay as Peter
- Macey Harlam as Ratoor
- Alice Dovey as Cynthia
- Norman Thorpe as Broadhurst

== Preservation ==
With no prints of The Romantic Journey located in any film archives, it is considered a lost film. In February 2021, the film was cited by the National Film Preservation Board on their Lost U.S. Silent Feature Films list.

== Bibliography ==
- James Robert Parish & Michael R. Pitts. Film directors: a guide to their American films. Scarecrow Press, 1974.
