= The Career of Katherine Bush =

1919 film by Roy William Neill

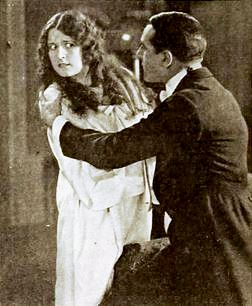
- Film still
- Directed by: Roy William Neill
- Written by: Kathryn Stuart
- Based on: The Career of Katherine Bush by Elinor Glyn
- Produced by: Adolph Zukor; Jesse Lasky
- Starring: Catherine Calvert; John Goldsworthy
- Distributed by: Paramount Pictures - Artcraft
- Release date: July 20, 1919
- Running time: 50 minutes
- Country: United States
- Language: Silent (English intertitles)

The Career of Katherine Bush is a lost 1919 American silent drama film produced by Famous Players–Lasky and distributed by Paramount Pictures. Roy William Neill directed and Catherine Calvert starred. The film is based on a 1916 Elinor Glyn novel.

== Plot ==
As described in a film magazine, Katherine Bush, a young woman from London's lower middle class, yearns for the finer things in life and spends an illicit weekend with a certain Lord Algy at a fashionable watering place. Returning home, she answers an advertisement that leads to a position as secretary to Lady Garrubardine, a leader of London society. Lord Gerald Strobridge, Lady Garrubardine's unhappily married nephew, falls in love with Katherine but she only offers him friendship. Katherine rises in Lady Garrubardine's estimation until she is almost an equal in the household. Then comes the Duke of Mordryn, a statesman who falls in love with Katherine, believing she is of his class. Learning the truth of her station, he continues his attentions and finally proposes. Katherine then tells him of her one misstep. He leaves her at once. Then Lord Gerald leaves for India, and Katherine believes the end of her dream of happiness has come. Lady Garrubardine, however, intervenes in her behalf, and the Duke comes to her, forgiving, and they are married.

== Starring ==
- Catherine Calvert as Katherine Bush
- John Goldsworthy as Lord Algernon Fitz-Rufus
- Crauford Kent as Lord Gerald Strobridge
- Mathilde Brundage as Lady Garrubardine (credited as Mrs. Mathilde Brundage)
- Helen Montrose as Lao Belemar
- Anne Dearing as Gladys Bush (credited as Ann Dearing)
- Augusta Anderson as Matilda Bush
- Nora Reed as Slavey (credited as Norah Reed)
- Claire Whitney as Lady Beatrice Strobridge
- Albert Hackett as Bert Bush
- Earl Lockwood as Fred Bush
- Walter Smith as Bob Hartley
- Robert Minot as Charlie Prodgers
- Edith Pierce as Ethel Bush
- Allan Simpson as Lao's Sweetheart (credited as Allen Simpson)
- Frederick Burton as Duke of Mordryn (credited as Fred Burton)
