= Strictly Dishonorable (play) =

Play written by Preston Sturges

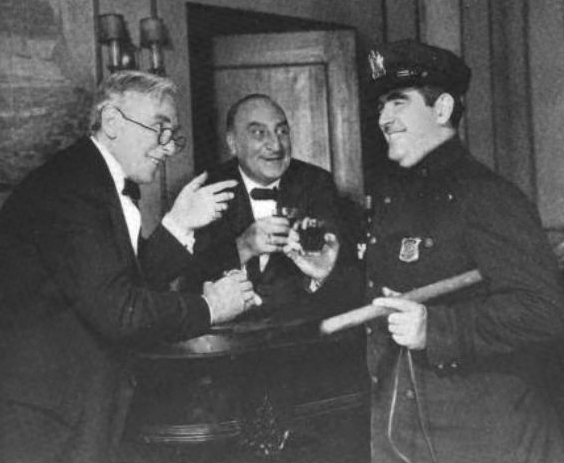
- Carl Anthony as Judge Dempsey, William Ricciardi as Tomato Antiovi, and Edward J. McNamara as Patrolman Mulligan
- Original language: English
- Written by: Preston Sturges
- Characters: Count Di Ruvo; Isabelle Parry; Judge Dempsey; Henry Greene; Patrolman Mulligan; Tomaso Antiovi; Giovanni; Mario
- Genre: Romantic comedy
- Setting: The NY speakeasy of Tomaso Antiovi and an apartment above it

Premiere
- Date: September 18, 1929
- Place: Avon Theatre (Broadway); New York City, New York

Strictly Dishonorable is a romantic comedy play written by Preston Sturges and first produced on Broadway in 1929. It was adapted for the screen twice, first in 1931, then again in 1951. The play was Sturges' second Broadway production, and the first of his plays to be made into a film. The Attic Theater Company revived the show at The Flea Theater in the summer of 2014.

== Broadway production ==
Sturges wrote the play shortly after being fired as the assistant stage manager for a road production of play called Frankie and Johnny. At liberty in Chicago, he started by writing two lines of dialogue: "What are your intentions?" "Strictly dishonorable." He wrote the play quickly, in about six days of work, and called it originally Come, Come, Isabelle, giving the ingenue his grandmother's maiden name, Isabelle Perry.

Sturges submitted the play to producer Brock Pemberton, whom he had worked for as a stage manager, and Pemberton accepted it. Rehearsals took three weeks and there was an additional week out of town, during which Sturges made numerous changes at Pemberton's insistence. The opening night audience was not responsive and Sturges, waiting at the back of the house, was concerned that the comedy was not going over. He left before the curtain came down and went out to drink, deliberately not reading the reviews. It was not until he called Pemberton in the morning to ask for two tickets for a friend that he found out that the play was a smash hit, garnering rave reviews.

The play had opened on September 18, 1929 – although Sturges recalled it as opening on the 19th – at the Avon Theatre and ran until January 1931, logging 557 performances. It was directed by Pemberton and Antoinette Perry, after whom the Tony Awards are named.

The success of Strictly Dishonorable, which earned him over $300,000, changed Sturges' life immediately:

The aura of sudden celebrity bestowed on me by Strictly Dishonorable attracted photographers, reporters, gossip columnists, professional panhandlers, producers, job offers, and a written demand from my biological father, Mr. Biden, for immediate repayment of the sums he has dispensed on my behalf when I was about a year old.

Offers came from film world, so Sturges picked up some fast money by writing film scripts. Shortly after, a play from his trunk, Recapture, went into production and opened to receive "the most violently destructive notices I had seen in years."

=== Broadway cast ===
The opening night cast of Strictly Dishonorable was:

- John Altieri as Giovanni
- Carl Anthony as Judge Dempsey
- Tullio Carminati as Count Di Ruvo
- Louis Jean Heydt as Henry Greene
- Muriel Kirkland as Isabelle Parry
- Edward J. McNamara as Patrolman Mulligan
- William Ricciardi as Tomaso Antiovi
- Marius Rogati as Mario

Cast notes:

- William Ricciardi was the only actor from the Broadway cast to play his role in the 1931 film adaptation.
