= The Heart of a Siren =

1925 film

Heart of a Siren
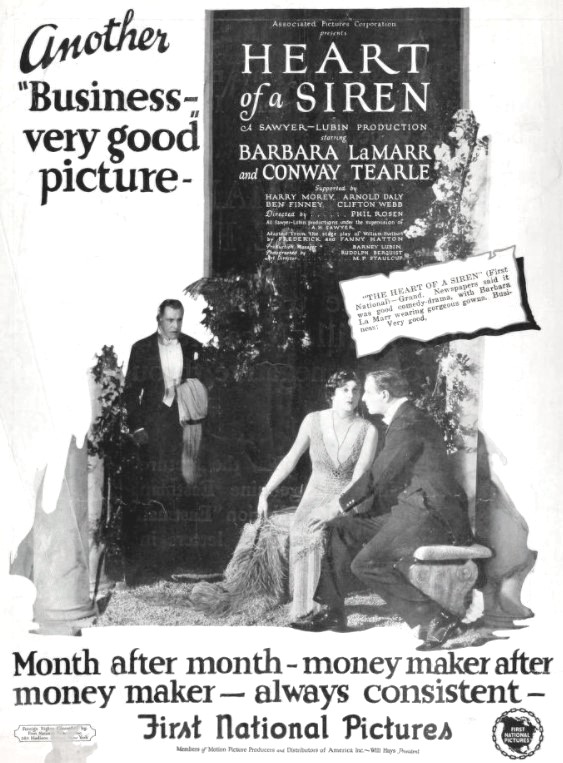
- Advertisement
- Directed by: Phil Rosen
- Written by: Frederic Hatton; Fanny Hatton (adaptation); Arthur Soerl (scenario)
- Based on: Hail and Farewell by William Hurlbut
- Produced by: Associated Pictures Corporation
- Starring: Barbara La Marr
- Cinematography: Rudolph Berquist
- Edited by: Elmer J. McGovern
- Distributed by: First National Pictures
- Release date: March 15, 1925
- Running time: 7 reels; 6,700 feet (72 minutes at 24 frames per second)
- Country: United States
- Language: Silent (English intertitles)

Heart of a Siren (also titled Heart of a Temptress) is a 1925 American silent romantic drama film directed by Phil Rosen and distributed by First National Pictures. Barbara La Marr starred in one of her last movies. It was based on the Broadway play Hail and Farewell.

== Plot ==
As described in a film magazine review, Isabella is a European siren who plays with men for her amusement. She is scorned by Gerald Rexford, an Englishman, and in revenge she brings him to her feet, but loses her heart to him. They live together until his mother persuades her that she is ruining Gerald's life. She makes him believe that she has given herself to a former admirer and he leaves her. Gerald learns of her sacrifice and returns to her, arriving just after she has supposedly drunk poison. Her watchful attendant, however, had emptied the bottle of poison and replaced it with a harmless liquid. The film ends on the promise of Isabella to marry Gerald.

== Cast ==
- Barbara La Marr as Isabella Echevaria
- Conway Tearle as Gerald Rexford
- Harry T. Morey as John Strong (credited as Harry Morey)
- Paul Doucet as Mario Gonzalez
- Benjamin F. Finney, Jr. as George Drew (credited as Ben Finney)
- Florence Auer as Lisette, Isabella's Maid
- Ida Darling as Mrs. Rexford, Duchess of Chatham
- William Ricciardi as Emilio, Isabella's Uncle
- Clifton Webb as Maxim
- Florence Billings as Lady Louise Calvert
- Michael Rayle as Pierre (credited as Mike Rayle)
- Harry Semels as Barfly (uncredited)
- Katherine Sullivan as Marie (uncredited)
- Tammany Young as Pickpocket (uncredited)

== Preservation ==
Prints of The Heart of a Siren are held by the UCLA Film & Television Archive, George Eastman Museum Motion Picture Collection, and Pacific Film Archive.
