= Lawrence Riley =

American dramatist and playwright

Lawrence Riley (1896–1974) was a successful American playwright and screenwriter. He gained fame in 1934 as the author of the Broadway hit Personal Appearance, which was turned by Mae West into the film Go West, Young Man (1936).

== Biography ==
Riley was born on November 1, 1896. He was a Princeton University alumnus and a World War I veteran, who served in the US Army. He started as a journalist on the East Coast. Subsequently, Riley achieved success as a playwright, which led to his becoming a sought-after Hollywood screenwriter. His wife, née Virginia Sweeney, was also a writer. Riley was a member of the Authors League and of Dramatists, Inc. Originally from Warren, Pennsylvania, Riley also lived in Bradford, and located the action of his breakthrough play, Personal Appearance, in Pennsylvania. This play earned him a fortune. During his career as a screenwriter, he owned homes in both New York City and Hollywood. Until his demise, the Rileys had been long-time residents of Riverside, a section of the town of Greenwich, Connecticut, the well-known community of the "rich and famous." Lawrence Riley died on November 29, 1974, at Stamford Hospital, in Stamford, Connecticut, at the age of 78.

== Plays ==
Riley's first and most famous play is Personal Appearance, a three-act comedy produced by the legendary Brock Pemberton of Tony Awards fame. It opened in 1934 at New York's Henry Miller Theatre and was a huge Broadway success, lasting for 501 performances. It starred Gladys George as a movie star and diva who encounters a young and handsome mechanic while on a tour making personal appearances to promote her latest film. Their ill-fated romance provides a biting satire of Hollywood. In 1935, Samuel French published Personal Appearance: a New Comedy in Three Acts in Los Angeles and New York. This play launched Riley's career as a playwright.

After a hiatus of more than five years, Riley returned to Broadway with Return Engagement, another three-act comedy, which opened at New York's John Golden Theatre in 1940. It was produced by the team of W. Horace Schmidlapp, Joseph M. Gaites and Lee Shubert. Return Engagement is a satire of the summer stock theatre and its plot concerns a pair of actors, previously married to each other but now divorced, whose acting parts mirror their real life. The play, starring Evelyn Varden and William Leicester, is set on the terrace of a playhouse near Stockton, Connecticut. After being panned in The New York Times by Brooks Atkinson, the most influential theater critic of his time, it closed after only eight performances. In 1942, Walter H. Baker Co. published Return Engagement: a Comedy in Three Acts in Boston and Los Angeles.

In 1944, Riley tested his next play, Time to Kill, at the Players Club of Warren, Pennsylvania, before submitting it to Pemberton. The same club had tested Riley's previous two plays but this time he also acted as director. For a change, Riley tackled the theme of murder in this melodramatic play: He declared that any humour in Time to Kill was unintentional.

Although he threw barbs at the summer stock theatres in Return Engagement, Riley had to keep trying out his plays in them. For example, his comedy Kin Hubbard was first performed in the summer of 1951 at the Westport County Playhouse in Westport, Connecticut. This biographical play co-starred June Lockhart (who had won a Tony three years before and is now remembered for her roles in TV's cult series Lassie and Lost in Space) and Tom Ewell (who was to star memorably in both the stage and screen versions of The Seven Year Itch, opposite Marilyn Monroe in the latter). Ewell made his debut as a producer with this play. Kin Hubbard is based on Fred C. Kelly's The Life and Times of Kin Hubbard. Frank McKinney "Kin" Hubbard (1868–1930) was one of America's most influential humorists and cartoonists, in addition to being a journalist, as Riley once was. Hubbard's cartoon "Abe Martin of Brown County" appeared in the Indianapolis News and countless other newspapers for three decades.

== Films ==
Personal Appearance was adapted for the screen by Mae West: It became Go West, Young Man, which was directed by Henry Hathaway. The film stars West in a rare instance of a role not originally conceived for her. The supporting cast includes Randolph Scott. The film was released in 1936 by Paramount and following its success, Riley was launched on a second career as a screenwriter—a somewhat ironical development in view of Riley's satire of Hollywood in Personal Appearance.

Riley's obituary in The New York Times, mentions the 1937 version of Kid Galahad (directed by Michael Curtiz and starring Bette Davis and Edward G. Robinson) among his screenplays, although his contribution to that script is not officially credited.

However, Riley is duly credited in the other film of Curtiz (co-directed by its producer, Herbert B. Leonard) released that same year: The Perfect Specimen. On that screenplay, Riley collaborated with Albert Beich, Fritz Falkenstein, N. Brewster Morse and Norman Reilly Raine. This Warner Bros. comedy is based on a story by Samuel Hopkins Adams. In this film, Errol Flynn plays a reclusive millionaire who gets to see how less-fortunate people live thanks to the efforts of an enterprising journalist played by Joan Blondell.

Ever Since Eve is another 1937 Warner Bros. comedy on which Riley worked. It was directed by Lloyd Bacon and derived from a short story by Gene Baker and Margaret Lee. Riley shared screenwriting credits with Earl W. Baldwin and Lillie Hayward (the dialogue by Brown Holmes was uncredited). The plot concerns an attractive office girl, played by Marion Davies, who masks her sex-appeal by wearing horn-rimmed glasses and dressing conservatively in order to discourage men's attentions. Her ploy fails when her boss, played by Robert Montgomery, catches her in her casual attire.

In 1939, Warner Bros. released On Your Toes, a musical directed by Ray Enright. The stage production of the same name had been a smash on Broadway, with the book by George Abbott, Lorenz Hart and Richard Rodgers; the music by Rodgers and the lyrics by Hart. Riley, Richard Macaulay, Jerry Wald and Sig Herzig wrote its screen adaptation. Choreographed by Balanchine, On your Toes tells the story of a vaudeville composer, played by Eddie Albert, with lofty aspirations, which he hopes to fulfill through his girlfriend, played by Vera Zorina, who is a member of a Russian dance troupe.

Four years later, Riley collaborated with Ben Barzman and Louis Lantz on the script of another musical, Universal's You're a Lucky Fellow, Mr. Smith (1943). It was directed by Felix E. Feist and is based on a story by Oscar Brodney. In it, a matchmaker, played by Patsy O'Connor, intervenes in a planned wedding by trying to substitute her brother, played by Allan Jones, for the intended groom.
