= The Uphill Path =

1918 film directed by James Kirkwood Sr.

- Directed by: James Kirkwood
- Written by: Bennett Musson
- Based on: story by Paul Armstrong
- Produced by: Frank A. Keeney
- Starring: Catherine Calvert
- Edited by: Bennett Musson
- Distributed by: States Rights
- Release date: June 1918
- Running time: 5 reels
- Country: USA
- Languages: Silent, English titles

The Uphill Path is a 1918 silent film drama directed by James Kirkwood and starring Catherine Calvert.

The film was shot at the old Biograph Studios. The working title for this film was The Girl with a Past.

The creator of the story, Paul Armstrong, had been married to Catherine Calvert. Armstrong died in 1915.

== Cast ==
- Catherine Calvert as Ruth Travers
- Guy Coombs as Daniel Clarkson
- Dudley Ayers as Chadwick Blake
- Frank Beamish as Howard Mason
- Charles Craig as Gilbert Hilton
- Russell Simpson as James Lawton
- Dorothy Dunn as Cecily Lawton
- Winona Bridges as Mrs. Clarkson
- Gene Lenot as Mrs. Blake

== Preservation status ==
- A print is preserved in the Library of Congress Packard Campus for Audio-Visual Conservation collection.
