= Harvey (play) =

1944 play by Mary Chase

- First edition 1953
- Original language: English
- Written by: Mary Chase
- Characters: Elwood P. Dowd; Veta Louise Simmons; Betty Chumley; E.J. Lofgren; Mrs. Ethel Chauvenet; Judge Omar Gaffney; William R. Chumley, M.D. Lyman Sanderson, M.D. Miss Johnson; Ruth Kelly, R.N. Myrtle Mae Simmons; Duane Wilson; Harvey
- Genre: Comedy
- Setting: The library of the Old Dowd Mansion; The Reception Room at Chumley's Rest

Premiere
- Date: November 1, 1944
- Place: 48th Street Theatre; New York City, New York

Harvey is a 1944 play by the American playwright Mary Chase, who received the Pulitzer Prize for Drama for the work in 1945. It has been adapted for film and television several times, most notably in a 1950 film starring James Stewart and Josephine Hull.

== Plot ==
Elwood P. Dowd is an affable man who claims to have an unseen (and presumably imaginary) friend Harvey – whom Elwood describes as a six foot, three-and-one-half inch pookah (Chase uses the spelling p-o-o-k-a as noted especially by the character Wilson who is reading the definition from a dictionary on page 33 of Chase's playbook) resembling an anthropomorphic rabbit. Elwood introduces Harvey to everyone he meets. His social-climbing sister, Veta Simmons, increasingly finds his eccentric behavior embarrassing. She decides to have him committed to a sanitarium. When they arrive at the sanitarium, a comedy of errors ensues. When Veta confesses that she has seen Harvey too, the young Dr. Sanderson commits Veta instead of Elwood. But when the mistake comes out, the search is on for Elwood and his invisible companion.

When Elwood shows up at the sanitarium looking for his lost friend Harvey, it seems that the mild-mannered Elwood has had a strange influence on the staff, including sanitarium director Dr. Chumley. Only just before Elwood is to be given an injection that will make him into a "perfectly normal human being, and you know what bastards they are!" (in the words of a taxi driver who has become involved in the proceedings) does Veta realize that she would rather have Elwood the same as he has always been – carefree and kind – even if it means living with Harvey.

== Scenes ==
Act I

- Scene 1 – The Dowd Library (Myrtle Mae, Veta, Miss Johnson, Elwood, Mrs. Chauvenet)
- Scene 2 – Chumley's Rest (Veta, Kelly, Sanderson, Elwood, Chumley, Wilson, Betty)

Act II

- Scene 1 – The Dowd Library (Myrtle Mae, Judge, Veta, Chumley, Wilson, Elwood)
- Scene 2 – Chumley's Rest (Kelly, Sanderson, Elwood, Wilson, Chumley)

Act III – Chumley's Rest (Chumley, Wilson, Myrtle Mae, Judge, Sanderson, Kelly, Veta, Elwood, Lofgren)

The only character to appear in all scenes is Elwood.

== Productions ==
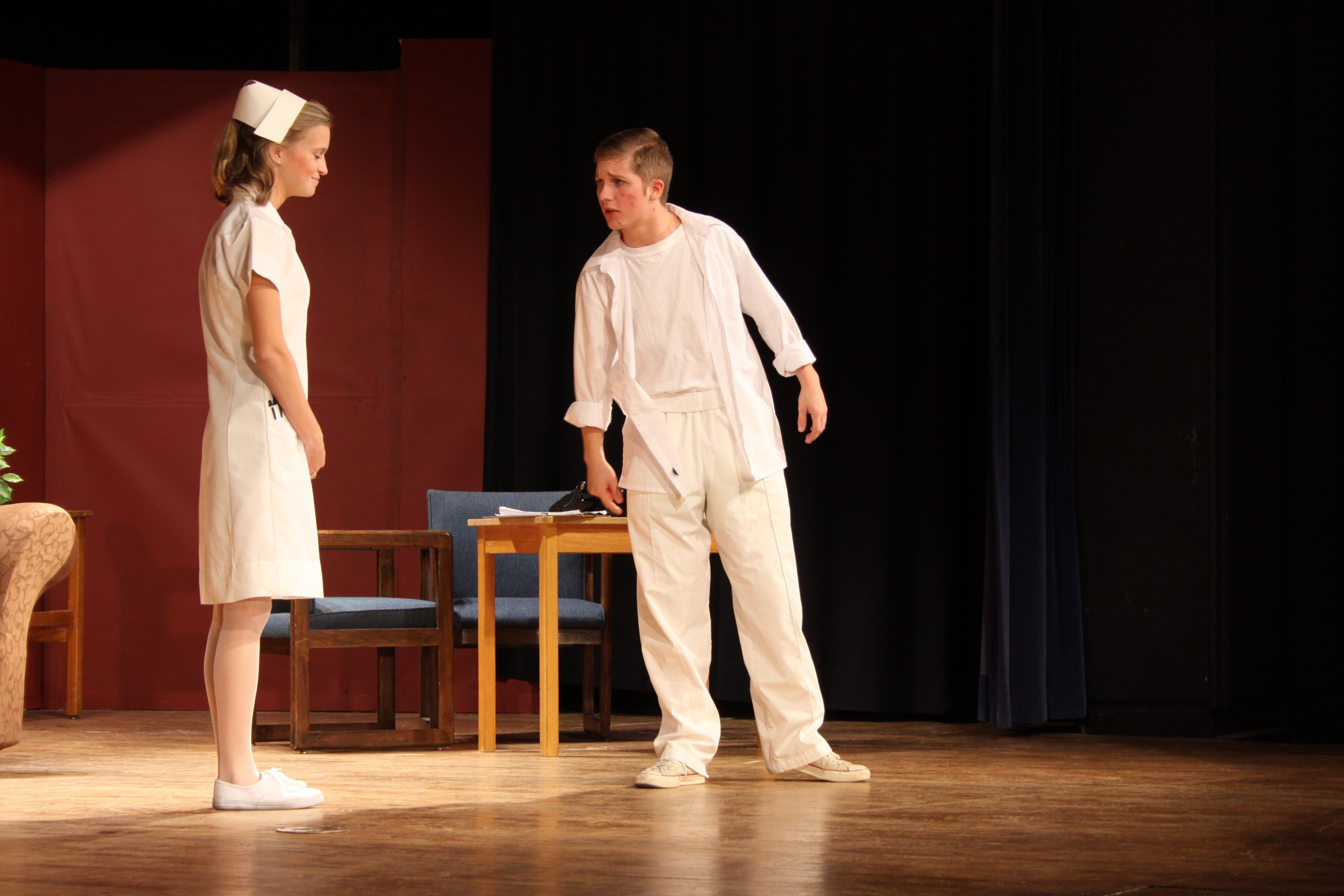
Students perform Harvey at Cleveland High School in Tennessee

Harvey premiered on Broadway on November 1, 1944, at the 48th Street Theatre and closed on January 15, 1949, after 1,775 performances, making it the fifth longest-running Broadway show up to that point. The original production was directed by Antoinette Perry and produced by Brock Pemberton and starred Frank Fay as Elwood P. Dowd and Josephine Hull as Elwood's sister Veta. Elwood was subsequently played during this run by Joe E. Brown, James Stewart, James Dunn, Bert Wheeler, and Jack Buchanan.

The play also had a production in 1949 at London's Prince of Wales Theatre starring Sid Field and Athene Seyler; then, after Field's death, Leslie Henson, who moved it to the Piccadilly Theatre and also took it on a national tour. (Note: After Sid Field died after a performance of Harvey on Friday 3 February 1950, his role as Elwood P. Dowd was played for a few days by his understudy, Harry Brunning. Leslie Henson took over the part and first performed it on Saturday 11 February 1950 for a month at the Prince of Wales Theatre, London. The play moved to the Piccadilly Theatre on Tuesday 14 March 1950, where it closed on Saturday 1 July 1950 after a total West End run of 613 performances. Leslie Henson then took it on tour for a run of 24 consecutive venues, opening at the Wimbledon Theatre on Monday 17 July 1950, and closing at the Prince of Wales Theatre, Cardiff on Saturday 20 January 1951.)

Dooley Wilson starred as Elwood in the 1951 Negro Drama Guild production, which also featured Butterfly McQueen as Myrtle Mae.

A Broadway revival at the ANTA Theatre ran from 24 February – 2 May 1970, and starred James Stewart and Helen Hayes. In 1975 Stewart appeared in a West End revival at the Prince of Wales Theatre, with Mona Washbourne in the role of Veta.

According to theatre historian Jordan Schildcrout, the reputation of the play, which had become a staple of amateur theatre groups, improved in the late 1980s because of critically esteemed professional revivals at the Woolly Mammoth Theatre in Washington, D.C., in 1987 and the Guthrie Theatre in Minneapolis in 1989. Other major productions at regional theatres followed at the Steppenwolf Theatre (1990), Cleveland PlayHouse (1991), Seattle Rep (1993), and La Jolla Playhouse (1994).

A further West End revival played at the Shaftesbury Theatre in 1995 starring Gorden Kaye and Rue McClanahan.

The Roundabout Theatre Company production of the Broadway revival opened in previews on May 18, 2012 (officially on June 14), at Studio 54. Directed by Scott Ellis, Jim Parsons starred as Elwood, with a cast that featured Jessica Hecht, Charles Kimbrough, Larry Bryggman, Morgan Spector, and Carol Kane.

In 2015 Harvey had another run in the West End from March 17 to May 2 at the Theatre Royal Haymarket. James Dreyfus played Elwood P. Dowd with Maureen Lipman as Veta.

== Adaptations ==
Universal Pictures acquired the film rights for a then record $1 million and the play was adapted for film by Chase, Oscar Brodney, and Myles Connolly in 1950. Directed by Henry Koster, it starred Josephine Hull (who won an Academy Award for her performance) and James Stewart.

Three US television adaptations have been made:

- The first, in 1958, starred Art Carney, Marion Lorne, Elizabeth Montgomery, Larry Blyden, Fred Gwynne, Charlotte Rae, and Jack Weston.
- In the second, James Stewart reprised his screen role in 1972 along with Helen Hayes, Fred Gwynne, Richard Mulligan, Madeline Kahn, Martin Gabel, and Arlene Francis. Hayes' portrayal of Veta is notably different from Hull's: at the end, when Veta discovers her change purse, she smiles.
- The last, in 1996, starred Harry Anderson, Swoosie Kurtz, Jessica Hecht (who appears in the 2012 revival), Leslie Nielsen, and William Schallert.

In addition, versions of the play were produced for West German television in 1959, 1967, 1970 (with Heinz Rühmann) and 1985 as Mein Freund Harvey (My Friend Harvey).

The play was adapted as Say Hello to Harvey, a stage musical by Leslie Bricusse, opening on September 14, 1981 in Toronto, where it closed prior to Washington DC and New York engagements. As Ken Mandelbaum noted in his 1991 book Not Since Carrie:

Elwood was played by Donald O'Connor, who had made his Broadway musical debut earlier the same year in another mistake, Bring Back Birdie. As Elwood's sister, Veta, Patricia Routledge gave another superb performance in a bomb; after (this show) she washed her hands of the American musical theatre ... (it) opened up a two-set play to include scenes in the bar only described by Elwood in the play and brought on an extraneous chorus for numbers like the opening "Smalltown U.S.A." In between the songs, Chase's original play still shone through.

On August 2, 2009, it was revealed that Steven Spielberg had committed to a new adaptation of the play, to be a co-production between 20th Century Fox and DreamWorks, with a screenplay written by Jonathan Tropper. On December 4, 2009, Spielberg announced that he had quit the project, partly due to his inability to find an actor willing and able to play Elwood Dowd.
