= Evidence (1929 film) =

1929 film

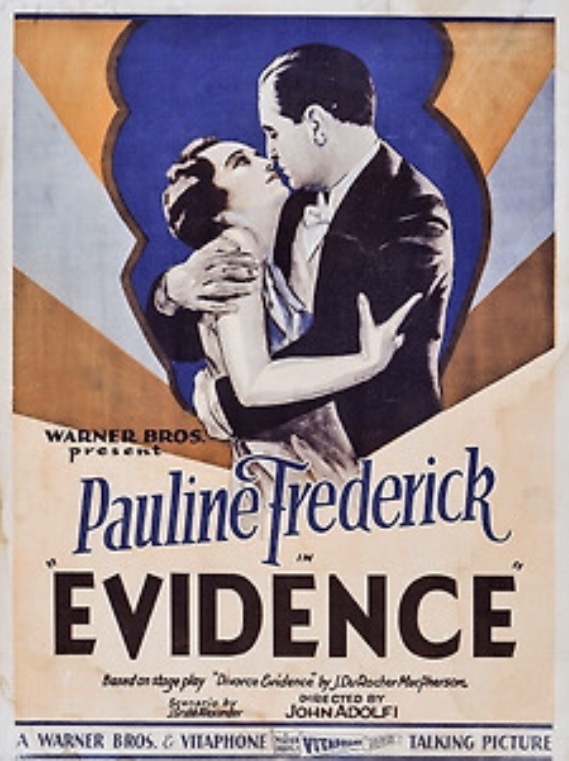
- Theatrical release poster
- Directed by: John G. Adolfi
- Written by: J. Grubb Alexander (screenplay); De Leon Anthony (titles)
- Based on: Evidence by J. duRocher MacPherson and L. duRocher MacPherson
- Starring: Pauline Frederick
- Cinematography: Barney McGill
- Music by: Rex Dunn
- Distributed by: Warner Bros. Pictures, Inc.
- Release date: December 5, 1929
- Running time: 79 minutes
- Country: United States
- Language: English

Evidence is a 1929 sound (All-Talking) Pre-Code crime drama film produced and distributed by Warner Bros. Pictures. It is based on the 1914 Broadway play Evidence by J. duRocher MacPherson and L. duRocher MacPherson. This early talkie was directed by John G. Adolfi and starred Pauline Frederick and Lowell Sherman. While this film is lost, its soundtrack, recorded by the Vitaphone process, survives.

== Plot ==
Myra Stanhope, once Lady Winiborne, is divorced by her husband, Lord Cyril Winiborne, who gains custody of their baby boy. This separation stems from circumstantial evidence linking Myra to the reckless Major Pollock. Major Pollock had deceitfully lured Myra to an inn, promising she would meet her husband there to reconcile after a quarrel. Instead, Lord Winiborne discovers them together, dismissing Myra's pleas of innocence, his legal mind convinced by the overwhelming evidence against her. Pollock flees England until the scandal subsides. He settles in Burma, where he assimilates into local life and becomes enamored with a native girl. However, when news reaches him that Myra has been spotted back in London, he immediately resolves to return.

Six years later, driven by a longing to see her son, Myra emerges from seclusion. She meets the boy in a park where he is regularly brought by Mrs. Debenham, a widow with her own designs on Lord Winiborne. The child, charmed by Mrs. Debenham, calls her his "princess," noting her resemblance to the portrait of his mother hanging at home. Their meetings continue smoothly until Mrs. Debenham informs Lord Winiborne, who then forbids the child from visiting the park. Harold Courtenay, a longtime friend of Lord Winiborne and a devoted admirer of Myra, finds her and urges her to marry him. She refuses. One evening, the boy invites his “princess” to dinner while Lord Winiborne, Courtenay, and Mrs. Debenham are all away. Courtenay, aware of this, plans for Lord Winiborne to return during the dinner to reunite mother and son. Though unforgiving, Lord Winiborne returns, and as Myra leaves, the boy quietly follows her.

Meanwhile, Major Pollock forces his way into Myra's home while she is absent, waiting for her return. When the child is discovered missing, Lord Winiborne obtains Myra's address from Courtenay and rushes to her. Pollock, drunk and threatening, confesses his guilt and declares Myra's innocence, attempting to bargain for her hand in marriage. When his offer fails, he takes his own life. Finding Pollock dead with the confession in hand, Lord Winiborne, believing Myra cannot forgive him, departs. Only then does Myra realize that Lord Winiborne had brought their son's clothes with him—a silent gesture showing his intent to reunite the boy with her, even before Pollock's confession was revealed. Courtenay celebrates the prospect of a family once torn apart by “circumstantial evidence” finally being brought back together.

== Cast ==
- Pauline Frederick as Myra Stanhope
- William Courtenay as Cyril Wimborne
- Conway Tearle as Harold Courtenay
- Lowell Sherman as Norman Pollock
- Alec B. Francis as Harbison
- Freddie Burke Frederick as Kenyon Wimborne
- Madeline Seymour as Mrs. Debenham
- Ivan F. Simpson as Peabody
- Myrna Loy as Native Girl
- Lionel Belmore as Innkeeper

== Music ==
The film features a theme song entitled "Little Cavalier" which was composed by M.K. Jerome and Al Dubin. Pauline Frederick sings the song in the film. The song is also played frequently as background music by the Vitaphone orchestra throughout the film.

== See also ==
- List of early sound feature films (1926–1929)
