= You Find It Everywhere =

1921 film

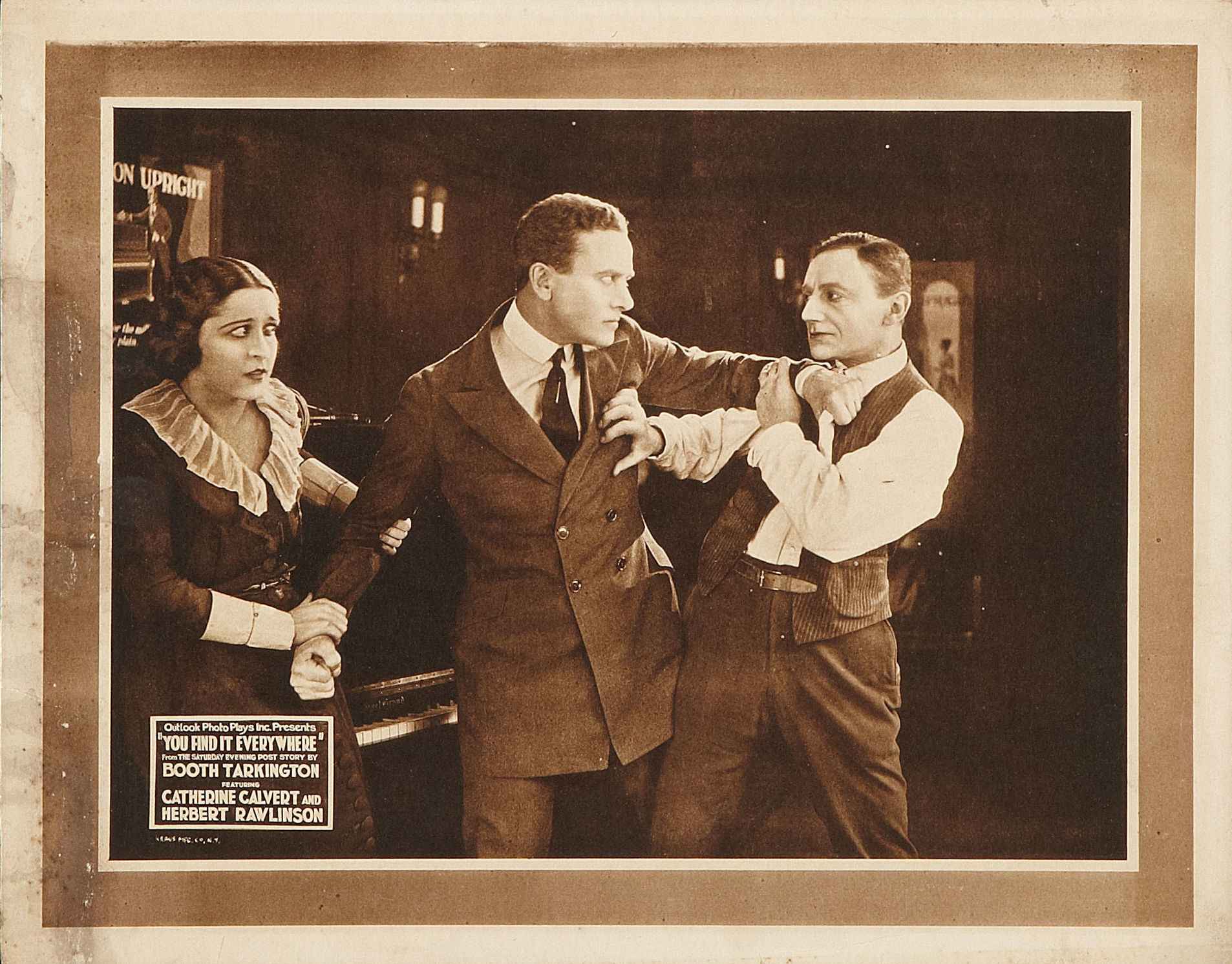
- Directed by: Charles Horan
- Based on: The Gibson Upright by Booth Tarkington
- Starring: Catherine Calvert; Herbert Rawlinson; Macey Harlam
- Cinematography: Harry Fischbeck
- Production company: Outlook Photoplays
- Distributed by: Jans Film Service
- Release date: July 1921
- Running time: 50 minutes
- Country: United States
- Languages: Silent; English intertitles

You Find It Everywhere is a 1921 American silent comedy film directed by Charles Horan and starring Catherine Calvert, Herbert Rawlinson and Macey Harlam. It is based on the 1919 novel The Gibson Upright by Booth Tarkington.

== Cast ==
- Catherine Calvert as Nora Gorodna
- Herbert Rawlinson as Andrew Gibson
- Macey Harlam as José Ferra
- Riley Hatch as Dan Carter
- Nathaniel Sack as Wurtzel Pantz
- Arnold Lucy as Charles Simpson
- Robert Ayerton as Ignatius Riley
- Jack Drumier as Harvey Hill
- Norbert Wicki as Salvatore
- Peggy Worth as Lila Normand
- Dora Mills Adams as Mrs. Normand
- Hattie Delaro as Mrs. Simpson

== Bibliography ==
- Connelly, Robert B. The Silents: Silent Feature Films, 1910-36, Volume 40, Issue 2. December Press, 1998.
- Munden, Kenneth White. The American Film Institute Catalog of Motion Pictures Produced in the United States, Part 1. University of California Press, 1997.
