= Catherine Calvert =

American actress

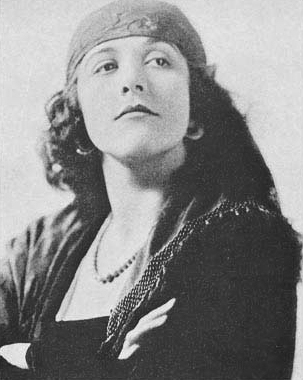
- From Who's Who on the Screen, 1920
- Born: Catherine Cassidy; April 20, 1890; Baltimore, Maryland, U.S.
- Died: January 18, 1971 (aged 80); Uniondale, New York, U.S.
- Occupation: Actress
- Spouses: Paul Armstrong (m. 1913; died 1915) George A. Carruthers (m. 1925; died 1952)
- Children: 1

Catherine Calvert (born Catherine Cassidy; April 20, 1890 – January 18, 1971) was an American actress.

== Biography ==
The daughter of Mr. and Mrs. Robert Cassidy, Catherine Calvert was born and raised in Baltimore, Maryland.

She made her stage debut in the play Brown of Harvard in September 1908, in Albany, New York. On Broadway, she portrayed Doris Moore in The Deep Purple (1911), May Joyce in The Escape (1913), and Dona Sol in Blood and Sand (1921).

After many years' experience onstage in productions including The Deep Purple (a play by Wilson Mizner and her future husband, Paul Armstrong), in 1910, she entered films via Keeney Pictures Corporation in A Romance of the Underworld (1918; based on a play in which she had appeared onstage).

Other films in which she appeared include Marriage, Out of the Night, Career of Katherine Bush, Marriage for Convenience, and Fires of Faith. Around 1920, she was a star of Vitagraph Studios.

Calvert married Armstrong in New Haven in 1913. They remained wed until his death in 1915. She later married Canadian grain exporter George A. Carruthers, who died in 1952.

In 1971, Calvert died in Uniondale, New York, at age 80.

== Filmography ==
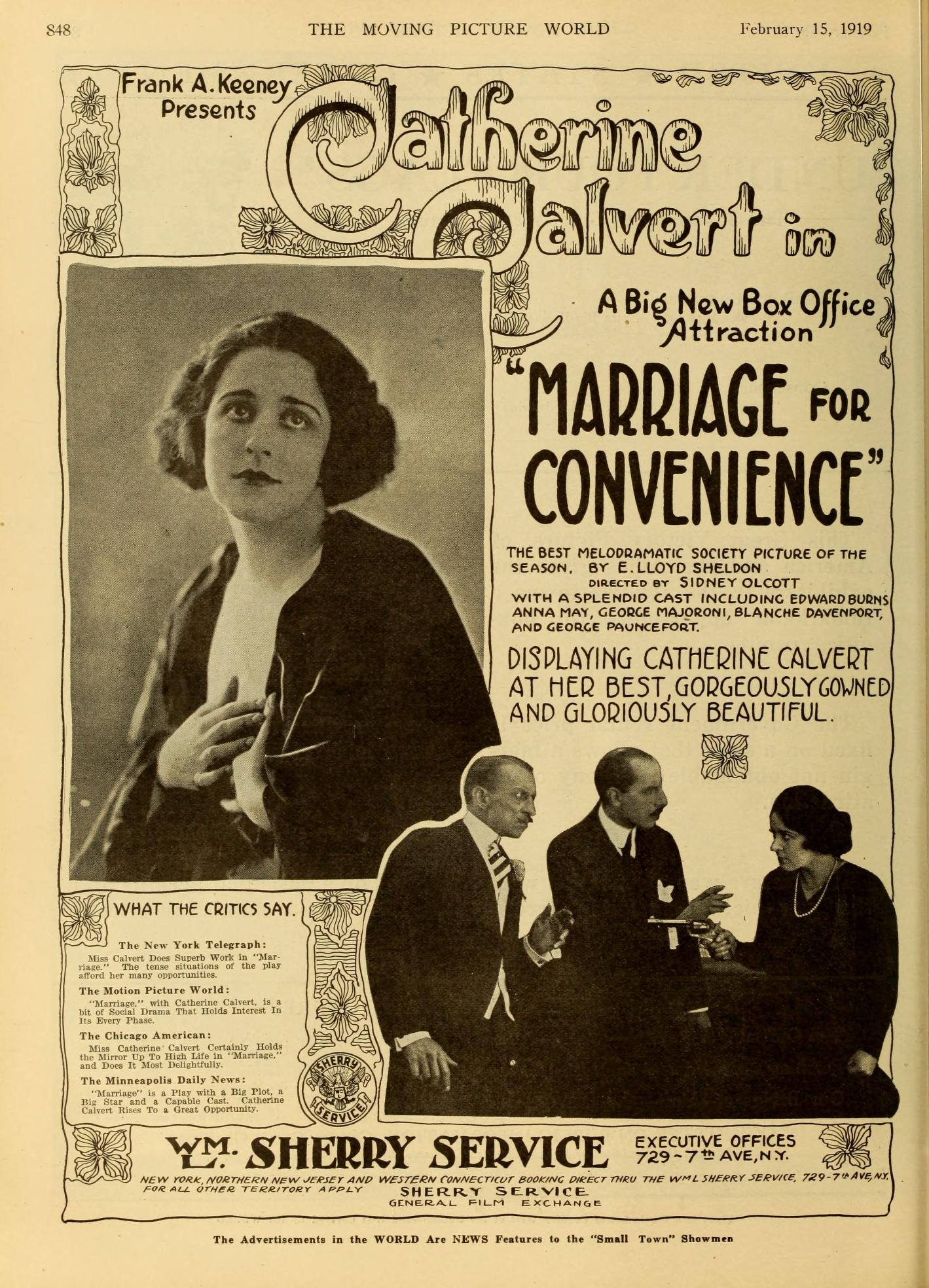
Marriage for Convenience (1919)

- Partners (1916) (*short)
- House of Cards (1917)
- The Peddler (1917))
- Think It Over (1917)
- Behind the Mask (1917)
- Outcast (1917)
- The Uphill Path (1918)
- A Romance of the Underworld (1918)
- Out of the Night (1918)
- Marriage (1918)
- Marriage For Convenience (1919)
- Fires of Faith (1919)
- The Career of Katherine Bush (1919)
- Dead Men Tell No Tales (1920)
- The Heart of Maryland (1921)
- You Find It Everywhere (1921)
- Moral Fibre (1921)
- The Green Caravan (1922)
- That Woman (1922)
- The Indian Love Lyrics (1923)
- Out to Win (1923)
