= Go West, young man =

American phrase

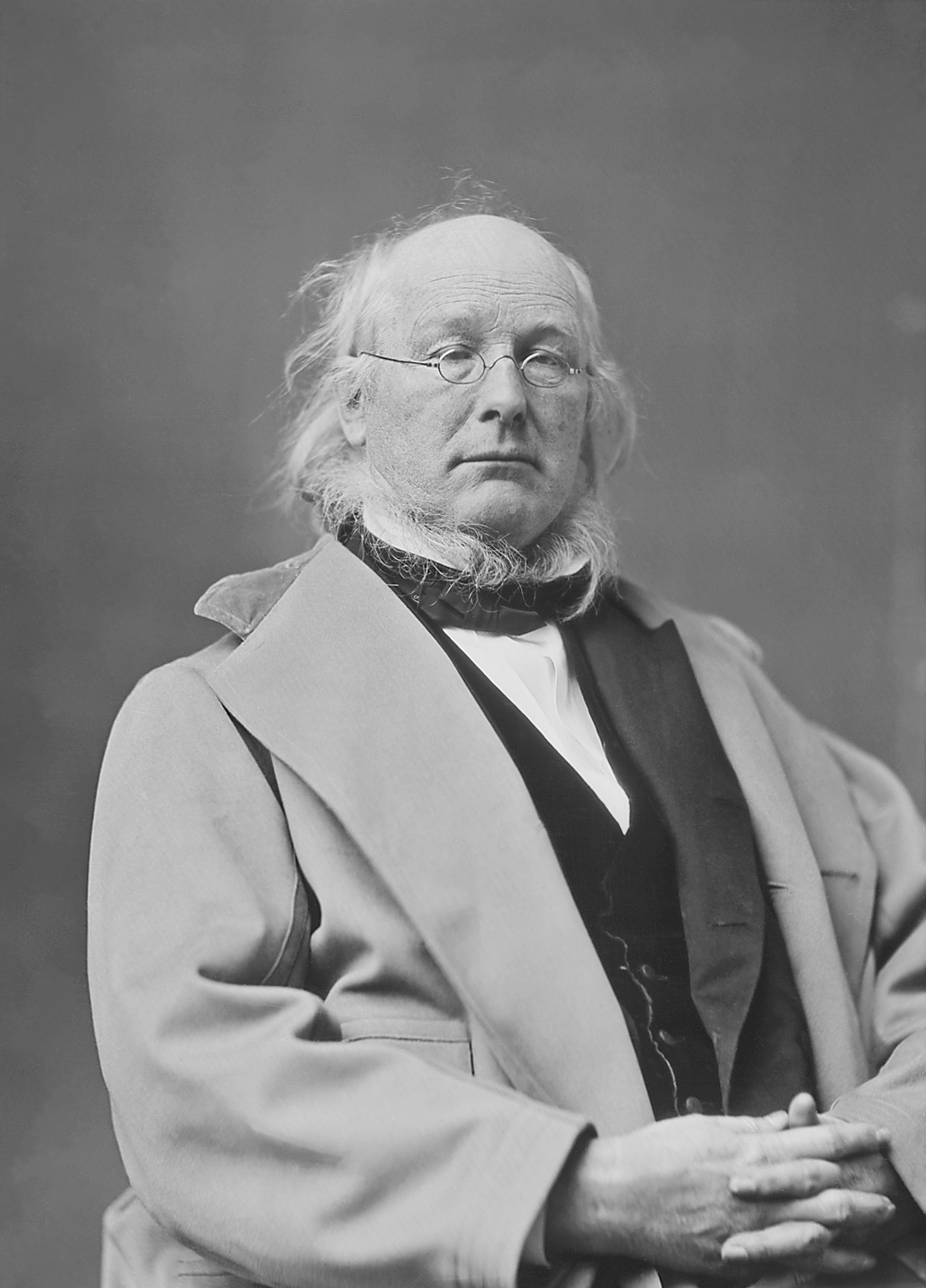
Horace Greeley, to whom the saying is attributed

"Go West, young man" is a phrase, the origin of which is often credited to the American author and newspaper editor Horace Greeley, concerning the United States' westward expansion as related to the concept of manifest destiny. No one has yet proven who first used this phrase in print, although 21st century analysis supports Greeley as the phrase originator.

Washington [D.C.] is not a place to live in. The rents are high, the food is bad, the dust is disgusting and the morals are deplorable. Go West, young man, go West and grow up with the country.

— attributed to Horace Greeley, New-York Daily Tribune, July 13, 1865

== The phrase ==
The Oxford Dictionary of Quotations gives the full quotation as, "Go West, young man, and grow up with the country", from Hints toward Reforms (1850) by Horace Greeley, but the phrase does not occur in that book.

== Background ==
In 1849, Samuel Merritt was making a name for himself as a physician in Plymouth, Massachusetts. Merritt, originally from Harpswell, Maine, completed a difficult operation on a friend of the aging statesman Daniel Webster. Webster lived in nearby Marshfield at the time. Impressed, Webster befriended the young doctor. As they spoke, Merritt admitted his fascination with the gold rush drawing people to California. Webster advised him, "Go out there, young man; go out there and behave yourself, and, free as you are from family cares, you will never regret it." Samuel took the advice.

Greeley favored westward expansion. He saw the fertile farmland of the west as an ideal place for people willing to work hard for the opportunity to succeed. The phrase came to symbolize the idea that agriculture could solve many of the nation's problems of poverty and unemployment characteristic of the big cities of the East. It is a commonly quoted saying of the nineteenth century and may have had some influence on the course of American history.

== Origin controversy ==
Josiah Bushnell Grinnell recounted in his autobiography that Horace Greeley first addressed the advice to him in 1833, before sending him off to Illinois to report on the Illinois Agricultural State Fair. Grinnell reports the full conversation as:

"Go West, young man, go West. There is health in the country, and room away from our crowds of idlers and imbeciles." "That," I said, "is very frank advice, but it is medicine easier given than taken. It is a wide country, but I do not know just where to go." "It is all room away from the pavements. ..."

— Josiah Bushnell Grinnell

Grinnell College historian Joseph Frazier Wall claims that Greeley himself denied providing that advice and "[spent] the rest of this life vigorously protesting that he had never given this advice to Grinnell or anyone else ...". In 1997, Wall wrote that an account of what he considered the true source of "Go West, young man" (and Greeley's disavowal of being the author of the phrase) was described in Dictionary of Quotations by Bergen Evans, published by Delacorte Press in New York in 1968 (p. 745:2). Wall also claimed that Indiana State Library newspaper librarian John L. Selch, in a December 12, 1983 letter to William Deminoff, confirmed that John B. L. Soule was the source for this statement.

Some claim the phrase was first stated by John Babsone Lane Soule in an 1851 editorial in the Terre Haute Express, "Go west young man, and grow up with the country"; and that Greeley later used the quote in his own editorial in 1865. However, the phrase does not appear in any 1851 editions of the Terre Haute Express. Author Ralph Keyes also suggests Soule as the source, offering an account in which the line originated from a bet between Soule and Indiana Congressman Richard W. Thompson over whether or not Soule could trick readers by forging a Greeley article. A 2004 research project published by the History Department of Indiana University found that the Soule attribution was based on a satirical account published in 1890. In 2007, an analysis of the phrase by the Skagit County Historical Society publication Skagit River Journal concluded: "the primary-source historical record contains not a shred of evidence that Soule had anything to do with the phrase."
