= Marriage for Convenience =

1919 American film

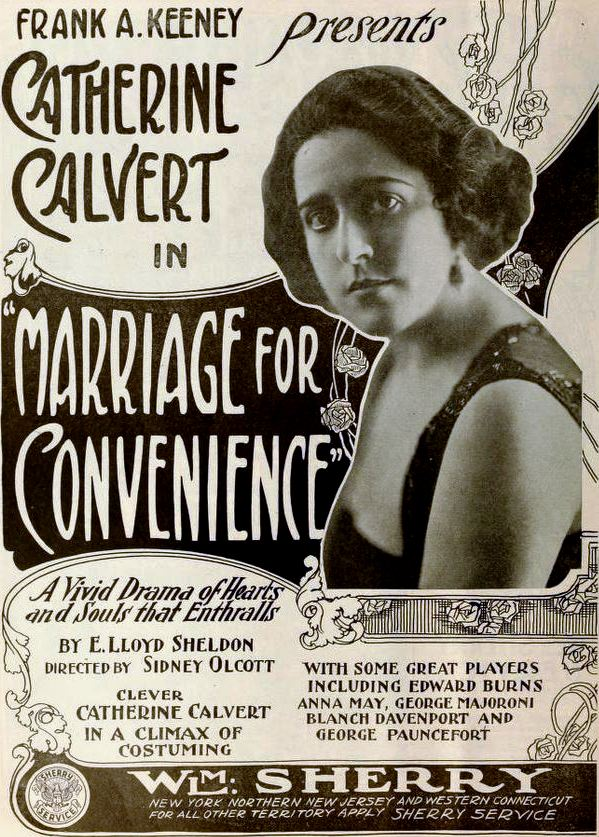
- Lobby poster
- Directed by: Sidney Olcott
- Written by: Bennet Musson (scenario)
- Story by: E. Lloyd Sheldon
- Produced by: Frank A. Keeney
- Starring: Catherine Calvert
- Cinematography: Larry Williams
- Distributed by: General Film Company
- Release date: February 3, 1919
- Running time: 5 reels
- Country: United States
- Language: Silent (English intertitles)

Marriage for Convenience is a 1919 silent film drama directed by Sidney Olcott and starring Catherine Calvert.

Prints of the film survive in the BFI National Archive, London, the Library of Congress, and George Eastman House Motion Picture Collection.

== Cast ==
- Catherine Calvert as Natalie Rand
- Ann May as Barbara Rand
- George Majeroni as Oliver Landis
- Henry Sedley as Howard Pollard
- Blanche Davenport as Mrs. Raleigh Rand
- Edmund Burns (Note: Credited as Edward Burns) as Ned Gardiner
- Sadie Leonard as Mrs. Daniel Chester
- George Pauncefort as Dick Stanton
- Cesare Gravina (Note: Credited as Caesar Gravina) as Lazzare
- Edward Slow as Negro servant
