= Strictly Dishonorable (1951 film) =

1951 film by Norman Panama, Melvin Frank

- title card
- Directed by: Melvin Frank; Norman Panama
- Written by: Melvin Frank; Norman Panama
- Based on: Strictly Dishonorable; 1929 play by Preston Sturges
- Produced by: Melvin Frank; Norman Panama
- Starring: Ezio Pinza; Janet Leigh
- Cinematography: Ray June
- Edited by: Cotton Warburton
- Music by: Mario Castelnuovo-Tedesco; Lennie Hayton
- Distributed by: Metro-Goldwyn-Mayer
- Release dates: June 26, 1951; July 11, 1951 (New York); August 22, 1951 (Los Angeles)
- Running time: 86 minutes
- Country: United States
- Language: English
- Budget: $1,182,000
- Box office: $881,000

Strictly Dishonorable is a 1951 romantic comedy film starring Ezio Pinza and Janet Leigh. Written, produced and directed by Melvin Frank and Norman Panama, it is the second film adaptation of Preston Sturges' 1929 hit Broadway play of the same name, following a pre-Code version released by Universal Pictures in 1931 under the same title.

== Plot ==
In 1920s New York, amorous opera star Augustino "Gus" Caraffa encounters Isabelle Perry, a naive music student from Mississippi and one of his most devoted admirers. When a newspaper photographer captures them in a compromising kiss, a marriage of convenience is proposed to avoid scandal. Isabelle, secretly in love with Gus, agrees to the arrangement, hoping that he will eventually return her feelings. An instigated breach of promise suit is brought by an avaricious former lover to undermine the hasty marriage. It manages to survive.

== Cast ==
- Ezio Pinza as Count Augustino "Gus" Caraffa
- Janet Leigh as Isabelle Perry
- Millard Mitchell as Bill Dempsey
- Gale Robbins as Marie Donnelly
- Maria Palmer as Countess Lili Szadvany
- Esther Minciotti as Mme. Maria Caraffa
- Silvio Minciotti as Uncle Nito
- Arthur Franz as Henry Greene
- Sandro Giglio as Tomasso
- Hugh Sanders as Harry Donnelly
- Mario Siletti as Luigi

== Production ==
Preston Sturges approached Metro-Goldwyn-Mayer with the idea remaking Strictly Dishonorable (1931) with Ezio Pinza and received $60,000 for the rights. However, Sturges was disappointed when he was not hired to write the screenplay.

Strictly Dishonorable was in production from mid-January through mid-March 1951 and was released on June 26 in several American markets.

Screen stars such as Greta Garbo, John Gilbert and Lewis Stone briefly appear in an incidental screening of the MGM film A Woman of Affairs (1928). Stone played the part of Judge Dempsey in the 1931 version of Strictly Dishonorable.

The film's operatic scenes were staged by Vladimir Rosing.

== Songs ==
- "I'll See You in My Dreams" by Isham Jones (music) and Gus Kahn (lyrics)
- "Everything I Have Is Yours" by Burton Lane (music) and Harold Adamson (lyrics)
- "La veau d'or" from the opera Faust by Charles Gounod (music) and Jules Barbier and Michel Carré (libretto)
- "Se a caso madama" from the opera Le nozze di Figaro by Wolfgang Amadeus Mozart (music) and Lorenzo da Ponte (libretto)
- Unnamed aria from the fictitious opera Il ritorno di Césare by Mario Castelnuovo-Tedesco (music and lyrics)

== Reception ==
In a contemporary review for The New York Times, critic Bosley Crowther wrote: "Directors Melvin Frank and Norman Panama, who also produced and wrote the script, work so close to the actors through this picture that you can see the caps on their teeth—and the wrinkles around their dewlaps, which are more than somewhat in this case. Further, the script which the writers have freely and forcibly contrived from the old Preston Sturges comedy, virtually a classic of the stage, is not what you'd call exactly a masterpiece of wit and comic art. ... [W]e cannot regard this milky nonsense as a match for Mr. Sturges' bright play."

== Box office ==
According to MGM records, the film earned $660,000 in the U.S. and Canada and $221,000 elsewhere, resulting in a loss of $664,000.

== Adaptations ==
Lux Radio Theatre broadcast a radio adaptation of the film on December 8, 1952, with Janet Leigh reprising her role and Fernando Lamas replacing Pinza.
