= John B. L. Soule =

American journalist

John Babsone Lane Soule (1815–1891) was an American publisher, minister, poet and professor.

Originally from Maine, he went to Phillips Exeter Academy in New Hampshire and graduated in 1840 from Bowdoin College in Maine.

Soule is credited with using the phrase "Go West, young man, go West" in an 1851 Terre Haute Express (Indiana) editorial, 14 years before a similar phrase was famously used by Horace Greeley in reference to western expansion in North America. The phrase is often attributed to Greeley. Greeley even reportedly tried to give Soule credit, but some journalists insisted Greeley had expressed those sentiments even earlier and Greeley had been the one to popularize the expression.

A research project from the History Department at Indiana University in 2004 concluded the Soule attribution was based on a satirical account published in 1890.

Soule taught at Vigo Collegiate Institute and Blackburn University in Illinois. Soule published a paper in Charleston, Illinois before returning to Terre Haute and buying the Terre Haute Express from David S. Donaldson.

His son moved to Las Vegas and then New Mexico. Soule communicated his support of his son's western journey.

Soule received honorary degrees of Master of Arts, Doctor of Philosophy and Doctor of Divinity from various schools.
