= Strictly Dishonorable (1931 film) =

1931 film directed by John M. Stahl

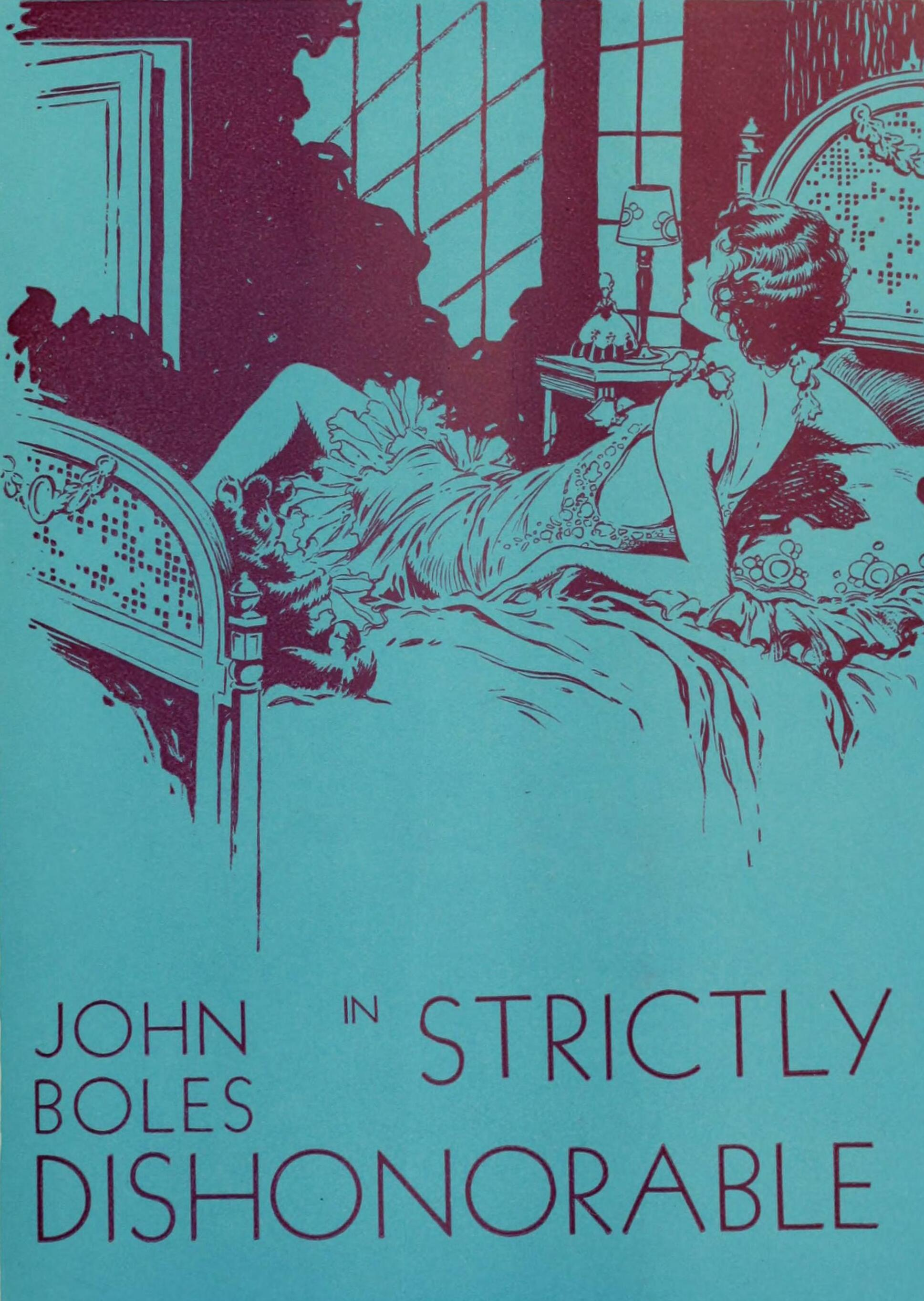
- 1930 advertisement for the play
- Directed by: John M. Stahl
- Screenplay by: Gladys Lehman
- Based on: Strictly Dishonorable; 1929 play by Preston Sturges
- Produced by: Carl Laemmle Jr. John M. Stahl
- Starring: Paul Lukas; Sidney Fox; Lewis Stone
- Cinematography: Karl Freund; Jackson Rose
- Edited by: Arthur Tavares; Maurice Pivar
- Music by: Giuseppe Becce; J. S. Zamecnik
- Distributed by: Universal Pictures
- Release date: December 26, 1931
- Running time: 91 minutes
- Country: United States
- Language: English

Strictly Dishonorable is a 1931 American pre-Code romantic comedy film directed by John M. Stahl and starring Paul Lukas, Sidney Fox, Lewis Stone, George Meeker, and Sidney Toler. It was written by Gladys Lehman and based on Preston Sturges' 1929 hit Broadway play of the same name. Strictly Dishonorable was Sturges' second play on Broadway, and his first to be filmed.

As a film made before the advent of the Production Code, the film-makers were able to preserve the cheerfully uninhibited sexual innuendo of the Sturges play in their movie version, which he is said to have endorsed.

== Plot ==
Snobbish, quick-tempered Henry Greene and his fiancée Isabelle Perry stop into a New York speakeasy owned by Tomasso Antiovi for a drink. They meet retired Judge Dempsey, an amiable man who befriends the Southern belle, much to Henry's dismay. Famous opera singer Tino Caraffa, a charming but notorious playboy, whose real name is Gus Di Ruvo, is there as well, and while Henry is gone to move his illegally parked car, Gus and Isabelle, an opera fan, get acquainted. When Henry returns, he's incensed to learn that the two of them have been dancing together. He wants Isabelle to leave with him, but she refuses and breaks their engagement, returning his ring. Henry tries to get the police to help him force Isabelle to leave by telling them that she has been "kidnapped by villains", but Judge Dempsey sets them straight, getting Henry arrested and taken away.

Gus offers to put Isabelle up for the night, assuring her that his intentions are "strictly dishonorable". The judge warns Isabelle about Gus, but she is adamant about staying because she has fallen in love. So too has Gus: Overwhelmed by Isabelle's sweetness and innocence, he spends the night in Judge Dempsey's apartment.

The next morning, Henry returns and tries to get Isabelle to come back to him. Despite appearances, she assures him that she has not lost her virtue and wants to know if he is still "pure". Challenged, he insists that it is "entirely different" for men. She reluctantly agrees to remain engaged to Henry, and he leaves to wait for her outside. Gus arrives and proposes marriage to Isabelle, but she does not believe that he loves her, and she leaves. When Gus and the judge go to get a drink, they find Isabelle there, crying. She confesses that she does love Gus, and the judge goes to tell Henry not to wait.

== Cast ==
- Paul Lukas as Count Gus Di Ruvo
- Sidney Fox as Isabelle Perry
- Lewis Stone as Judge Dempsey
- George Meeker as Henry Greene
- William Ricciardi as Tomasso Antiovi
- Sidney Toler as Patrolman Mulligan
- Carlo Schipa as Waiter
- Samuel Bonello as Waiter
- Joe Torillo as Cook
- Joseph W. Girard as Officer
- Aldo Franchetti as Arguing Customer

== Production ==
Universal paid Preston Sturges the record sum of $125,000 for the rights to Strictly Dishonorable, equal only to RKO's 1931 purchase of the rights to Cimarron.

William Ricciardi is the only actor who also appeared in the Broadway production of Strictly Dishonorable. Dempsey was the maiden name of Preston Sturges' mother. Natalie Moorhead played the role of Lilli, one of Gus's lovers, but her scenes were deleted. Sidney Toler went on to fame playing Charlie Chan.

The film was in production from June 30 to August 15, 1931, and was released on December 26 of that year. The Los Angeles premiere took place at the Carthay Circle Theatre.

== Other versions ==
Sturges' play was filmed again in 1951, and released by MGM under the same title, Strictly Dishonorable. It was written, produced and directed by Melvin Frank and Norman Panama, and starred Ezio Pinza and Janet Leigh. Much of the sexual innuendo of the original was scrubbed from the remake, which included both operatic appearances and songs sung by former international star Pinza.
