= Tony Awards =

Annual awards for Broadway theatre

Tony Award
- Previous: 79th Tony Awards; June 7, 2026; Next: 80th Tony Awards; June 13, 2027
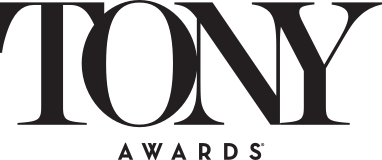
- Awarded for: Excellence in Broadway theatre
- Country: United States
- Presented by: American Theatre Wing and The Broadway League
- First award: April 6, 1947; 79 years ago by American Theatre Wing
- Website: www.tonyawards.com

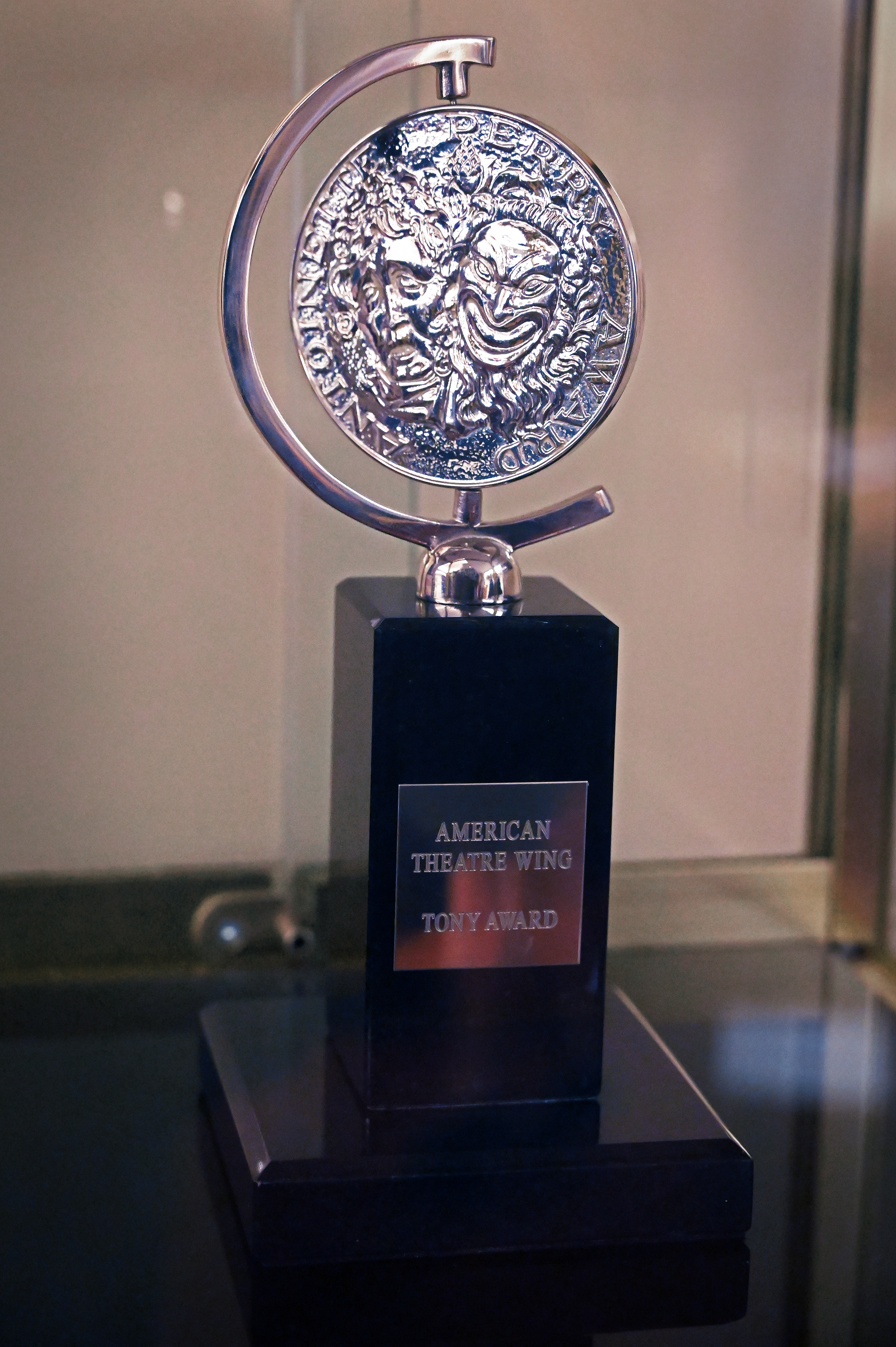
The Tony Award medallion designed by Herman Rosse in 1949, mounted on its base used since 2010.

The Antoinette Perry Award for Excellence in Broadway Theatre, more commonly known as a Tony Award, recognizes excellence in live Broadway theatre. The awards are presented by the American Theatre Wing and The Broadway League at an annual ceremony in Manhattan. The ceremony is usually held in June.

The awards are given for Broadway productions and performances. One is also given for regional theatre. Several discretionary non-competitive awards are given as well, including a Special Tony Award, the Tony Honors for Excellence in Theatre, and the Isabelle Stevenson Award.

The awards were founded by theatre producer and director Brock Pemberton. They are named after Antoinette "Tony" Perry, an actress, producer, theatre director and administrator who was co-founder and secretary of the American Theatre Wing. The trophy consists of a spinnable medallion, with faces portraying an adaptation of the comedy and tragedy masks, mounted on a black base with a pewter swivel.

The rules for the Tony Awards are set forth in the official document "Rules and Regulations of The American Theatre Wing's Tony Awards", which applies for that season only. The Tony Awards are the New York theatre industry's equivalent to the Emmy Awards for television, the Grammy Awards for music, and the Academy Awards (Oscars) for cinema. A person who has won all four is said to have won the EGOT. The Tony Awards are the U.S. equivalent of the United Kingdom's Laurence Olivier Awards, France's Molière Awards, Spain's Premios Max, Australia's Helpmann Awards, Norway's Hedda Award and Russia's Golden Mask.

== Award categories ==
Most recent Tony Award winners
- 2026 Tony Awards
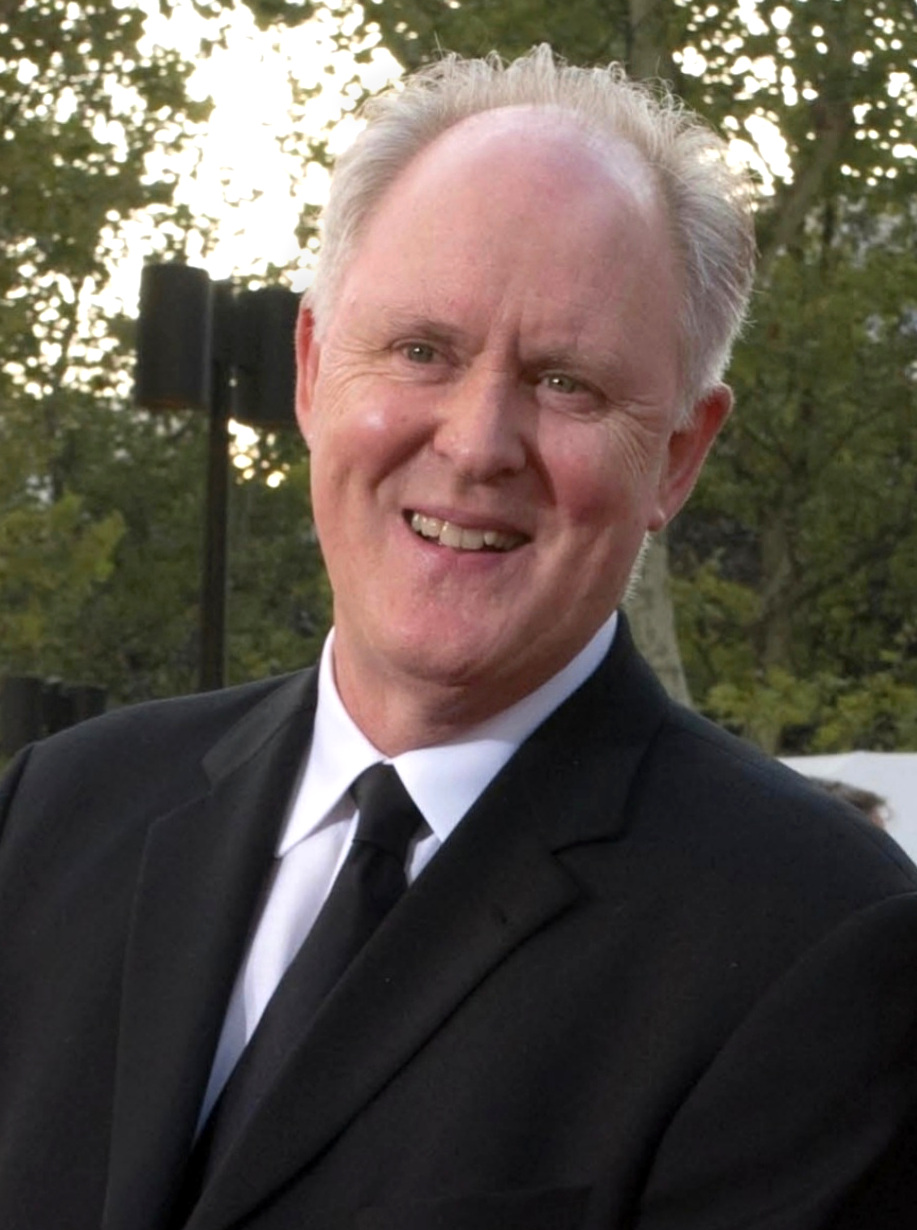

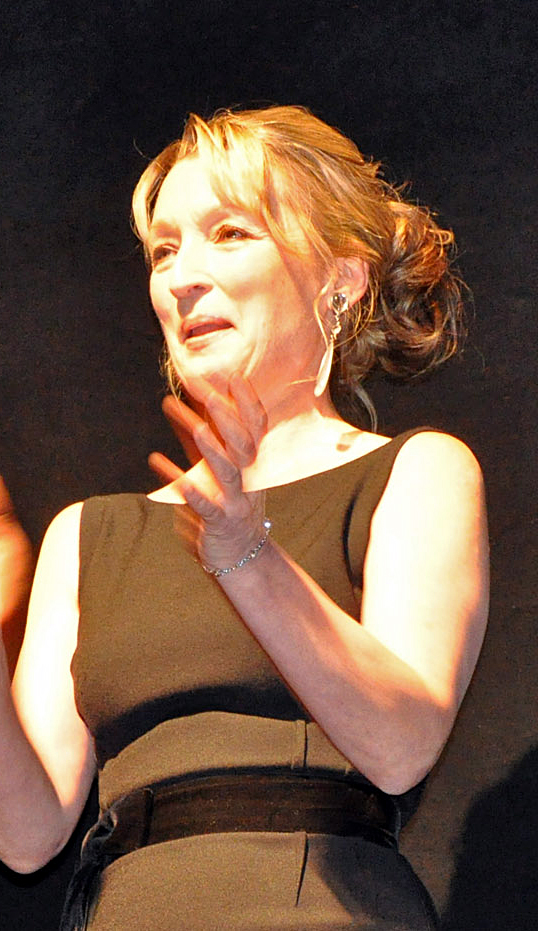

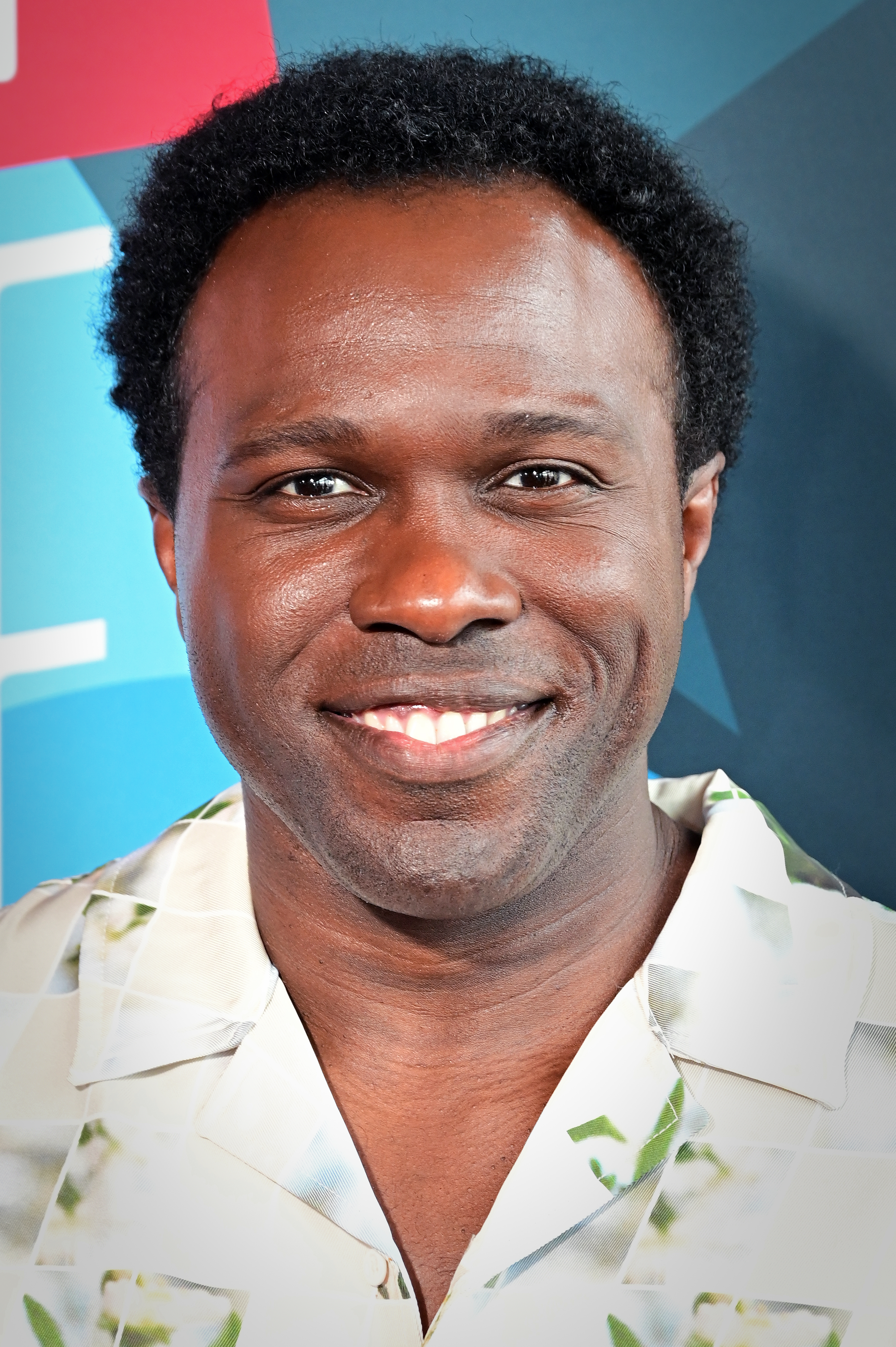

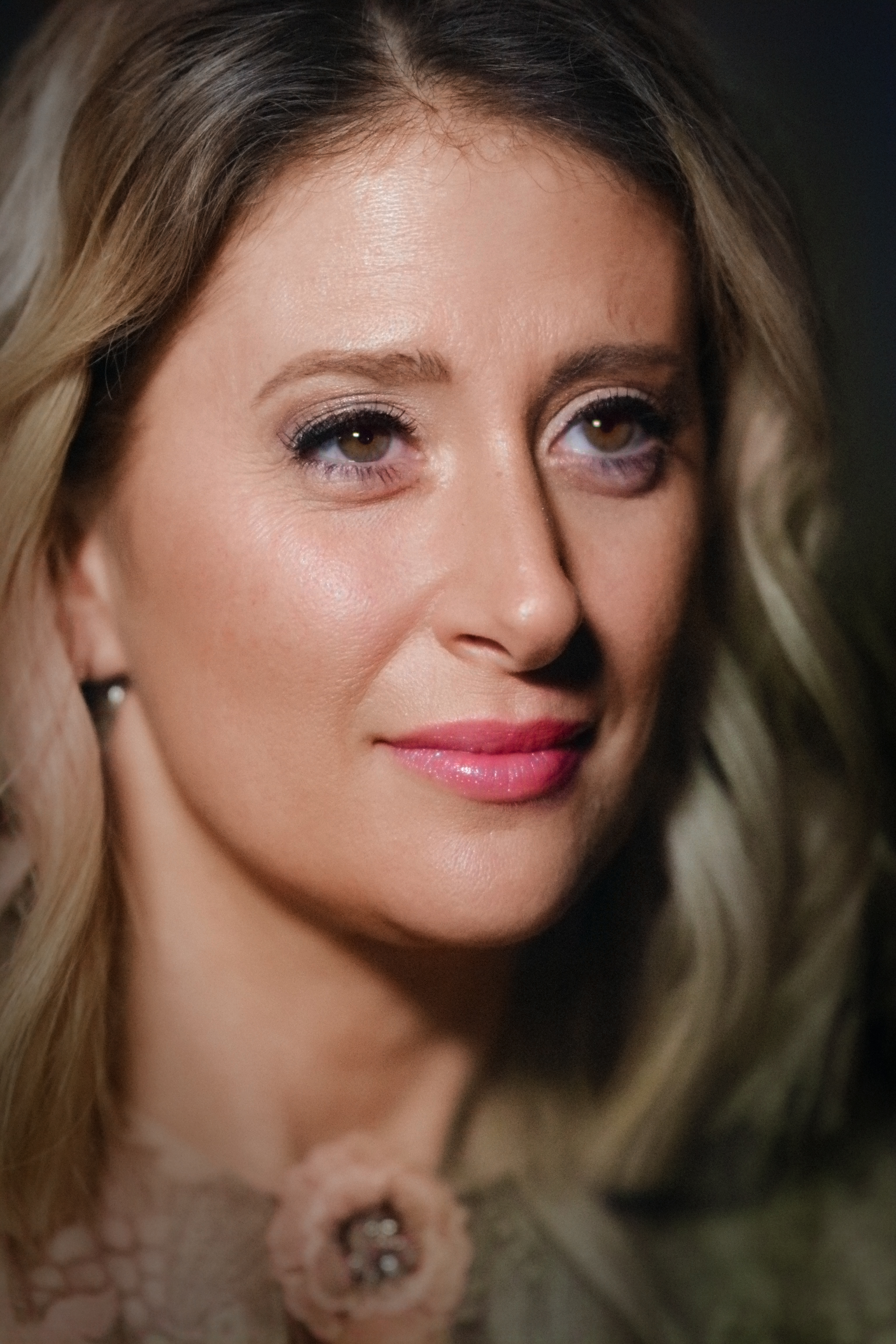

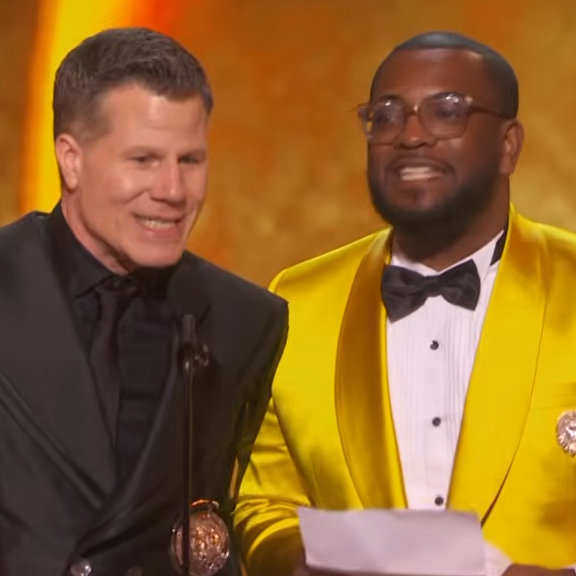

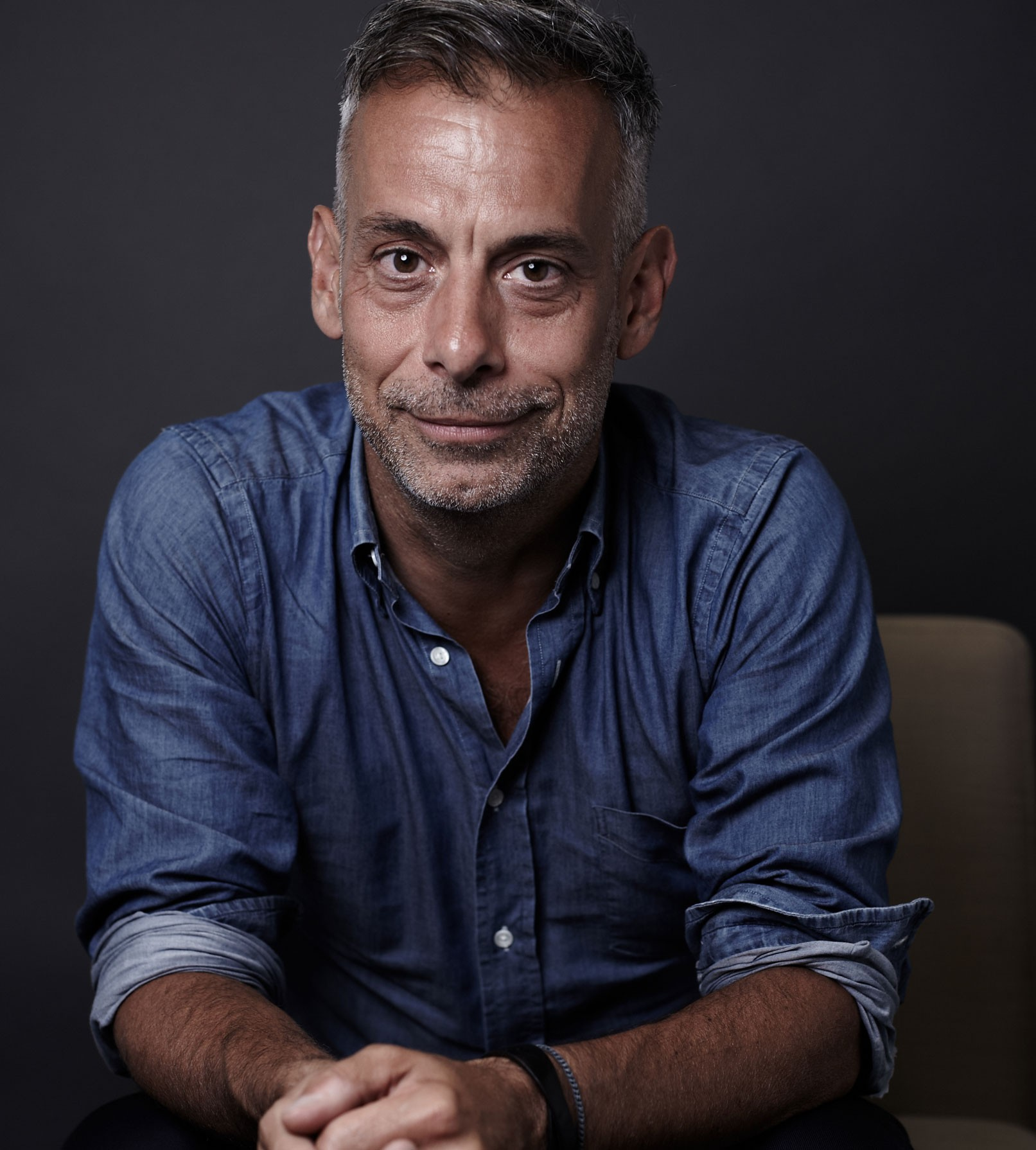
Award	Best Leading Actor in a Play	Best Leading Actress in a Play
Winner	John Lithgow (Giant)	Lesley Manville (Oedipus)
Award	Best Leading Actor in a Musical	Best Leading Actress in a Musical
Winner	Joshua Henry (Ragtime)	Caissie Levy (Ragtime)
Award	Best Direction of a Musical	Best Direction of a Play
Winner	Zhailon Levingston and Bill Rauch (Cats: The Jellicle Ball)	Joe Mantello (Death of a Salesman)
Previous Best Musical
Maybe Happy Ending
Previous Best Play
Purpose
Best Musical
Schmigadoon!
Best Play
Liberation

As of 2014, there were 26 categories of awards, in addition to several special awards. Starting with 11 awards in 1947, the names and number of categories have changed over the years. Some examples: the category Best Book of a Musical was originally called "Best Author (Musical)". The category of Best Costume Design was one of the original awards. For two years, in 1960 and 1961, this category was split into Best Costume Designer (Dramatic) and Best Costume Designer (Musical). It then went to a single category, but in 2005 it was divided again. For the category of Best Director of a Play, a single category was for directors of plays and musicals prior to 1960.

A then-newly established non-competitive award, the Isabelle Stevenson Award, was given for the first time at the awards ceremony in 2009. The award is for an individual who has made a "substantial contribution of volunteered time and effort on behalf of one or more humanitarian, social service or charitable organizations".

The category of Best Special Theatrical Event was retired as of the 2009–2010 season. The categories of Best Sound Design of a Play and Best Sound Design of a Musical were retired as of the 2014–2015 season.

On April 24, 2017, the Tony Awards administration committee announced that the Sound Design Award would be reintroduced for the 2017–2018 season.

=== Performance categories ===
- Best Performance by a Leading Actor in a Play
- Best Performance by a Leading Actress in a Play
- Best Performance by a Featured Actor in a Play
- Best Performance by a Featured Actress in a Play
- Best Performance by a Leading Actor in a Musical
- Best Performance by a Leading Actress in a Musical
- Best Performance by a Featured Actor in a Musical
- Best Performance by a Featured Actress in a Musical

=== Show and technical categories ===
- Best Musical
- Best Revival of a Musical
- Best Direction of a Musical
- Best Book of a Musical
- Best Original Score
- Best Orchestrations
- Best Choreography
- Best Scenic Design in a Musical
- Best Costume Design in a Musical
- Best Lighting Design in a Musical
- Best Sound Design of a Musical
- Best Play
- Best Revival of a Play
- Best Direction of a Play
- Best Scenic Design in a Play
- Best Costume Design in a Play
- Best Lighting Design in a Play
- Best Sound Design of a Play

=== Special awards ===
- Regional Theatre Tony Award
- Special Tony Award (includes Lifetime Achievement Award)
- Tony Honors for Excellence in Theatre
- Isabelle Stevenson Award

=== Retired awards ===
- Best Author
- Best Conductor and Musical Director
- Best Costume Design (split into two categories: Best Costume Design in a Musical and Best Costume Design in a Play)
- Best Lighting Design (split into two categories: Best Lighting Design in a Musical and Best Lighting Design in a Play)
- Best Newcomer
- Best Revival (split into two categories: Best Revival of a Musical and Best Revival of a Play)
- Best Scenic Design (split into two categories: Best Scenic Design in a Musical and Best Scenic Design in a Play)
- Best Stage Technician
- Best Special Theatrical Event
- Best Director (split into two categories: Best Direction of a Musical and Best Direction of a Play)

== History ==

The award was founded in 1947 by a committee of the American Theatre Wing (ATW), headed by Brock Pemberton. The award is named after Antoinette Perry, nicknamed Tony, an actress, director, producer and co-founder of the American Theatre Wing, who died in 1946. As her official biography at the Tony Awards website states, "At [Warner Bros. story editor] Jacob Wilk's suggestion, [Pemberton] proposed an award in her honor for distinguished stage acting and technical achievement. At the initial event in 1947, as he handed out an award, he called it a Tony. The name stuck." Nevertheless, the awards were sometimes referred to as the "Perry Awards" in their early years.

The 1st Tony Awards was held on April 6, 1947, at the Waldorf Astoria hotel in New York City. The first prizes were "a scroll, cigarette lighter and articles of jewelry such as 14-carat gold compacts and bracelets for the women, and money clips for the men". ATW co-founder Louise Heims Beck was responsible for overseeing the organization of the first awards. It was not until the third awards ceremony in 1949 that the first Tony medallion was given to award winners.

Since 1967, the award ceremony has been broadcast on U.S. national television and includes songs from the nominated musicals, and occasionally has included video clips of, or presentations about, nominated plays. The American Theatre Wing and The Broadway League jointly present and administer the awards. Audience size for the telecast is generally well below that of the Academy Awards shows, but the program reaches an affluent audience, which is prized by advertisers. According to a June 2003 article in The New York Times: "What the Tony broadcast does have, say CBS officials, is an all-important demographic: rich and smart. Jack Sussman, CBS's senior vice president in charge of specials, said the Tony show sold almost all its advertising slots shortly after CBS announced it would present the three hours. 'It draws upscale premium viewers who are attractive to upscale premium advertisers,' Mr. Sussman said..."

The viewership has declined from the early years of its broadcast history. For example, the number of viewers in 1974 was 20 million; in 1999, it was 9.2 million. For most of the 2000s, viewership was between six and eight million viewers. In contrast, the 2009 Oscar telecast had 36.3 million viewers. From 1987 to 2004, the award ceremony was represented by long-time Broadway press agency, Keith Sherman & Associates. Since 2003, all Tony Awards ceremonies have ended with the Tony Award for Best Musical.

=== Medallion ===
The Tony Award medallion was designed by art director Herman Rosse and is a mix of mostly brass and a little bronze, with a nickel plating on the outside; a black acrylic glass base, and the nickel-plated pewter swivel. The face of the medallion portrays an adaptation of the comedy and tragedy masks. Originally, the reverse side had a relief profile of Antoinette Perry; this later was changed to contain the winner's name, award category, production and year. The medallion has been mounted on a black base since 1967.

A larger base was introduced and first presented in the 2010 award ceremony. That base is slightly taller – 5 inches (13 cm), up from 3 1/4 inches (8.3 cm) – and heavier – 3 1/2 pounds (1.6 kg), up from 1 1/2 pounds (680 grams). This change was implemented to make the award "feel more substantial" and easier to handle at the moment the award is presented to the winners, according to Howard Sherman, the executive director of the American Theatre Wing:

We know the physical scale of the Oscars, Emmys and Grammys. While we're not attempting to keep up with the Joneses, we felt this is a significant award, and it could feel and look a bit more significant... By adding height, now someone can grip the Tony, raise it over their head in triumph and not worry about keeping their grip. Believe me, you can tell the difference.

For the specific Tony Awards presented to a Broadway production, awards are given to the author and up to two of the producers free of charge. All other members of the above-the-title producing team are eligible to purchase the physical award. Sums collected are designed to help defray the cost of the Tony Awards ceremony itself. An award cost $400 as of at least 2000, $750 as of at least 2009, and, as of 2013, had been $2,500 "for several years", according to Tony Award Productions.

== Details of the Tony Awards ==
Source: Tony Awards Official Site, Rules

=== Rules for a new play or musical ===
For the purposes of the award, a new play or musical is one that has not previously been produced on Broadway and is not "determined… to be a 'classic' or in the historical or popular repertoire", as determined by the Administration Committee (per Section (2g) of the Rules and Regulations). The rule about "classic" productions was instituted by the Tony Award Administration Committee in 2002, and stated (in summary) "A play or musical that is determined ... to be a 'classic' or in the historical or popular repertoire shall not be eligible for an award in the Best Play or Best Musical Category but may be eligible in that appropriate Best Revival category." Shows transferred from Off-Broadway or the West End are eligible as "new", as are productions based closely on films.

This rule has been the subject of some controversy, as some shows, such as Hedwig and the Angry Inch and Violet, have been ruled ineligible for the "new" category, meaning that their authors did not have a chance to win the important awards of Best Play or Best Musical (or Best Score or Best Book for musicals). On the other hand, some people feel that allowing plays and musicals that have been frequently produced to be eligible as "new" gives them an unfair advantage because they will have benefited from additional development time as well as additional familiarity with the Tony voters.

=== Committees and voters ===
The Tony Awards Administration Committee has twenty-four members: ten designated by the American Theatre Wing, ten by The Broadway League, and one each by the Dramatists Guild, Actors' Equity Association, United Scenic Artists and the Society of Stage Directors and Choreographers. This committee, among other duties, determines eligibility for nominations in all awards categories.

The Tony Awards Nominating Committee makes the nominations for the various categories. This rotating group of theatre professionals is selected by the Tony Awards Administration Committee. Nominators serve three-year terms and are asked to see every new Broadway production. The Nominating Committee for the 2012–13 Broadway season (named in June 2012) had 42 members; the Nominating Committee for the 2014–2015 season has 50 members and was appointed in June 2014.

There are approximately 868 eligible Tony Award voters (as of 2014), a number that changes slightly from year to year. The number was decreased in 2009 when the first-night critics were excluded as voters. That decision was changed, and members of the New York Drama Critics' Circle were invited to be Tony voters beginning in the 2010–2011 season.

The eligible Tony voters include the board of directors and designated members of the advisory committee of the American Theatre Wing, members of the governing boards of Actors' Equity Association, the Dramatists Guild, the Society of Stage Directors and Choreographers, United Scenic Artists, and the Association of Theatrical Press Agents and Managers, members of the Theatrical Council of the Casting Society of America and voting members of The Broadway League (in 2000, what was then The League of American Theaters and Producers changed membership eligibility and Tony voting status from a lifetime honor to all above-the-title producers, to ones who had been active in the previous 10 years. This action disenfranchised scores of Tony voters, including Gail Berman, Harve Brosten, Dick Button, Tony Lo Bianco, and Raymond Serra).

=== Eligibility date (Season) ===
To be eligible for Tony Award consideration, a production must have officially opened on Broadway by the eligibility date that the Management Committee establishes each year. For example, the cut-off date for eligibility the 2013–2014 season was April 24, 2014. The season for Tony Award eligibility is defined in the Rules and Regulations.

In 2020, the 74th Annual Tony Awards were postponed due to the COVID-19 pandemic. On August 21, 2020, it was announced that the 74th Annual Tony Awards would take place digitally later in 2020.

=== Broadway theatre ===
A Broadway theatre is defined as having 500 or more seats, among other requirements. While the rules define a Broadway theatre in terms of its size, not its geographical location, the list of Broadway theatres is determined solely by the Tony Awards Administration Committee. As of the 2016–2017 season, the list consisted solely of 41 theaters: 40 located in the vicinity of Times Square in New York City and Lincoln Center's Vivian Beaumont Theater.

== Criticism ==
While the theatre-going public may consider the Tony Awards to be the Oscars of live theatre, critics have suggested that the Tony Awards are primarily a promotional vehicle for a small number of large production companies and theatre owners in New York City. In a 2014 Playbill article, Robert Simonson wrote that "Who gets to perform on the Tony Awards broadcast, what they get to perform, and for how long, have long been politically charged questions in the Broadway theatre community..." The producers "accept the situation ... because just as much as actually winning a Tony, a performance that lands well with the viewing public can translate into big box-office sales." Producer Robyn Goodman noted that, if the presentation at the ceremony shows well and the show wins a Tony, "you're going to spike at the box office".

The awards met further criticism when they eliminated the sound design awards in 2014. In 2014, a petition calling for the return of the Sound Design categories received more than 30,000 signatures. Addressing their previous concerns over Tony voters in the category, it was announced that upon the awards' return for the 2017–2018 season, they would be decided by a subset of voters based on their expertise.

Some advocates of gender equality and non-binary people have criticized the separation of male and female acting categories in the Tony Awards, Academy Awards, and Emmy Awards. Though some commentators worry that gender discrimination would cause men to dominate unsegregated categories, some other award categories are unsegregated. The Grammy Awards went gender-neutral in 2012, while the Daytime Emmy Awards introduced a single Outstanding Younger Performer in a Drama Series category in 2019 to replace their two gender-specific younger actor and actress categories. In 2023, J. Harrison Ghee and Alex Newell became the first openly nonbinary actors to be nominated for Tony Awards, and both went on to win in their respective categories. The same year, fellow nonbinary performer Justin David Sullivan withdrew from Tony consideration due to the gendered categories.

== See also ==
- List of black Tony Award winners and nominees
- Drama Desk Awards
- Helpmann Awards
- Laurence Olivier Awards
- List of Tony Awards ceremonies
- List of Tony Award-nominated productions
- Obie Award
- Society of London Theatre
- Theatre World Award
