= Rouge et Noir =

Rouge et Noir - French for "red and black" - may refer to:

- Rouge et Noir (patience), a solitaire (patience) card game
- Rouge et Noir (gambling game), a gambling game also known as Trente et Quarante
- Le rouge et le noir (The Red and the Black), an 1830 French novel by Stendhal
  - Le rouge et le noir, a 1954 French film based on Stendhal's novel, and known in English as The Red and the Black
- Rouge et Noir, a cheese brand of the Marin French Cheese Company
- The Ottawa Redblacks of the Canadian Football League, whose Francophone nickname is Le Rouge et Noir.
