= Chef salad =

American salad

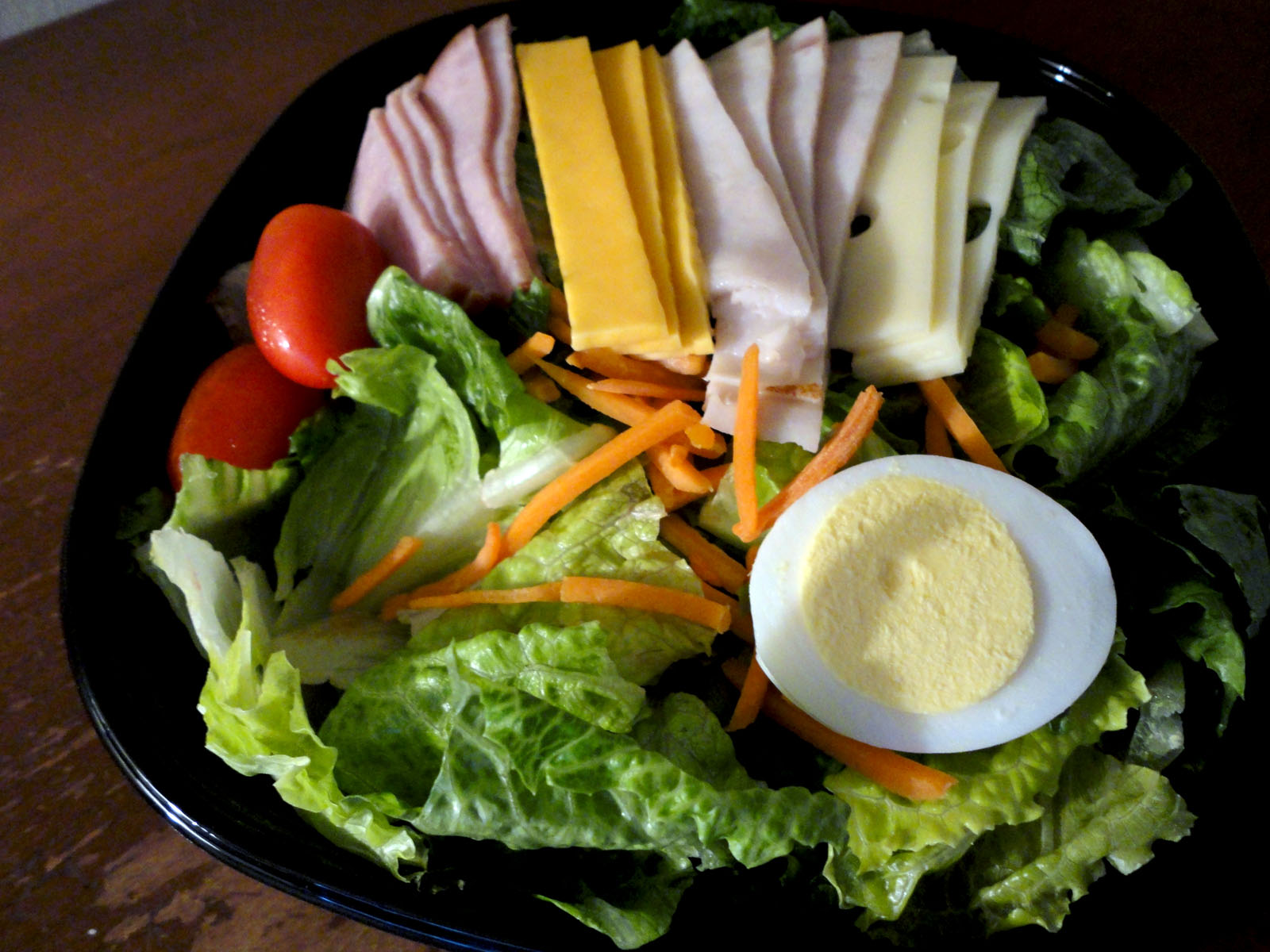
- Alternative names: Chef's salad
- Type: Salad
- Created by: disputed
- Main ingredients: Hard-boiled eggs, meat, tomatoes, cucumbers, cheese, leaf vegetables

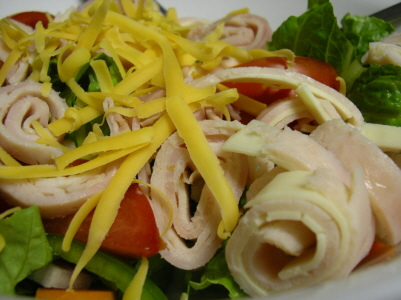
Chef salad

Chef salad (or chef's salad) is an American salad consisting of hard-boiled eggs, one or more varieties of meat (such as ham, turkey, chicken, or roast beef), tomatoes, cucumbers, and cheese, all placed upon a bed of tossed lettuce or other leaf vegetables. Several early recipes also include anchovies. A variety of dressings may be used with this salad.

== History ==
Food historians do not agree on the history and composition of chef's salad. Some trace it to salmagundi, a popular meat and salad dish originating in 17th-century England and popular in colonial America. Others contend chef's salad is a product of the early twentieth century, originating in either New York or California. The person most often connected with the history of this salad is Louis Diat, chef of the Ritz-Carlton in New York City during the 1940s. While food historians acknowledge his recipe, they do not appear to be convinced he originated the dish, which is more popularly attributed to chef Victor Seydoux at the Hotel Buffalo, a Statler Hotel in Buffalo, New York. Seydoux first learned his craft in Montreux, Switzerland, and continued his studies in France and England before coming to work in the United States.

Seydoux's first experiences in the U.S. included positions at the Waldorf-Astoria Hotel and the Ritz-Carlton. Alice Rose Seydoux, widow of Victor, claims that the salad was officially launched at the Hotel Buffalo. When the customers started requesting the off-menu salad made with cuts of meat, cheese and hard boiled eggs, the hotel decided to add it to the menu. Giving chef Seydoux the honor of naming the salad he is purported to have said "Well, it's really a chef's salad."

The chef salad probably owes much of its popularity to Louis Diat, chef at the Ritz-Carlton. Cooking a la Ritz includes Diat's recipe, which includes a base of chopped lettuce topped with julienned boiled chicken, smoked ox tongue and smoked ham, then garnished with hard-cooked egg halves and watercress, all dressed with French Dressing. The inclusion of this salad on the menu at the Ritz-Carlton would have introduced the salad to more of the public. It is possible that the inclusion of Thousand Island dressing is also linked to the Ritz, since the hotel also introduced the dressing to New York City. Several other early chef salad recipes mention crumbling Roquefort cheese over the salad.

The first known printed recipe dates to 1936 and includes many ingredients found in later recipes, but no meat. A 1926 recipe already includes the garlic-rubbed salad bowl. In a note following the recipe, the author recounts the following story:

While passing through a kitchen one day, I found the above mixture in huge bowl in the center of the chef's table, and being friendly to salads as well as cooks, I requested a sample and was served very liberally. The salad was delicious; in fact it was a sort of master composition and deserving of an appropriate name. As nothing but the best of everything enters into the food materials supplied to chef's table, the salad was born and named Cooks Salad." I have been more or less successful in ordering this particular salad; but if I wish to get this salmagundy right I order it from the chef's table and not the salad pantry. The chef's salad bowl is generally rubbed with garlic."

=== Menu History (see photos) ===
"Cook's Salad" appears on a Statler Hotel Buffalo carte du jour menu dated December 1926.

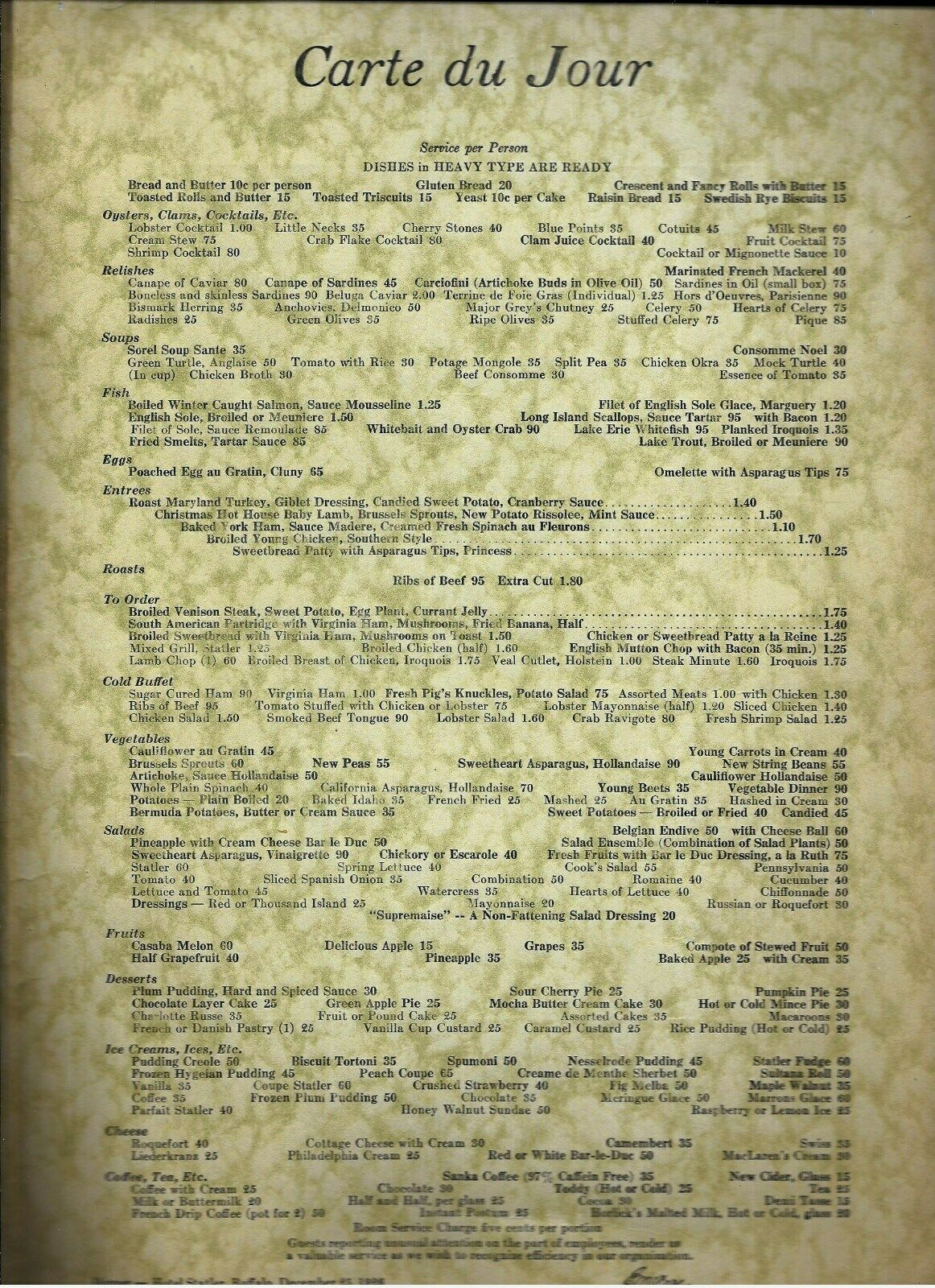
1926 Statler Buffalo Menu "Cook's Salad"

"Cook's Salad" appears on a Statler Hotel Buffalo dinner menu dated July 1928.

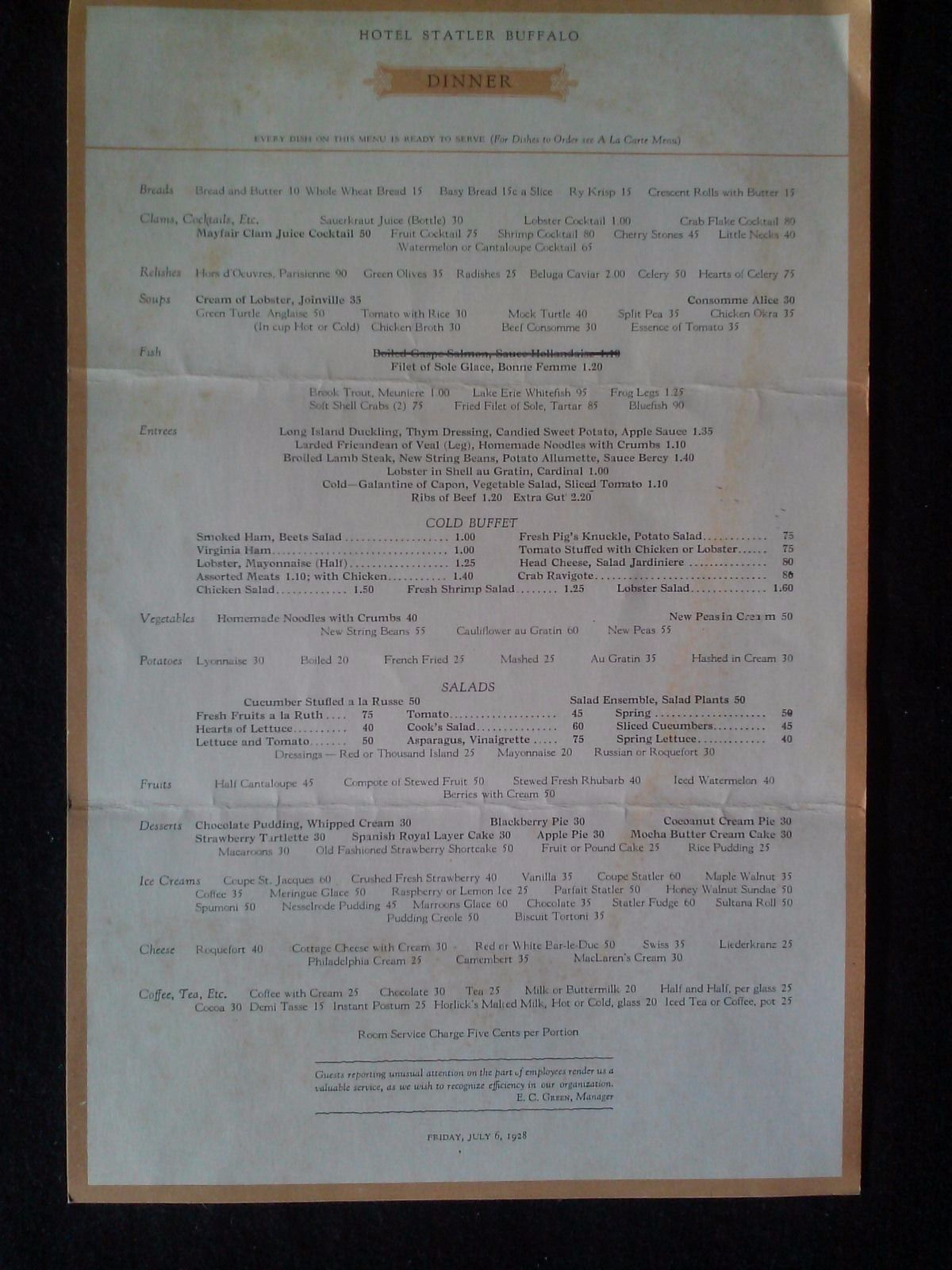
1928 Statler Buffalo Cooks Salad

Chef Victor Seydoux and staff during a photo shoot in 1923.

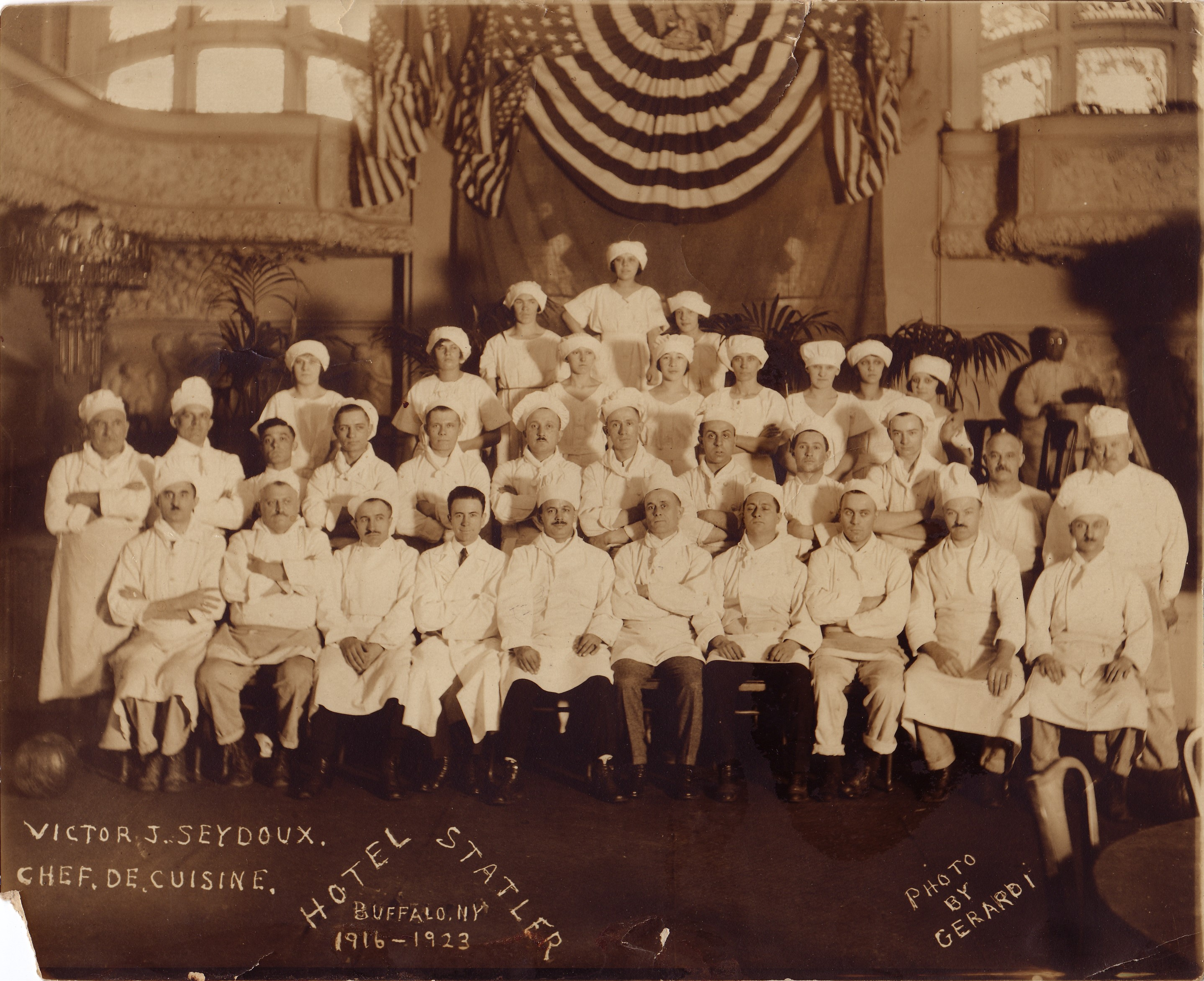
Group shot with Chef Seydoux, alleged creator of Chef Salad, in first row, fifth from the left

"Chef's Salad" appears on a Hotel Pennsylvania (NYC) dinner menu dated September 1929.

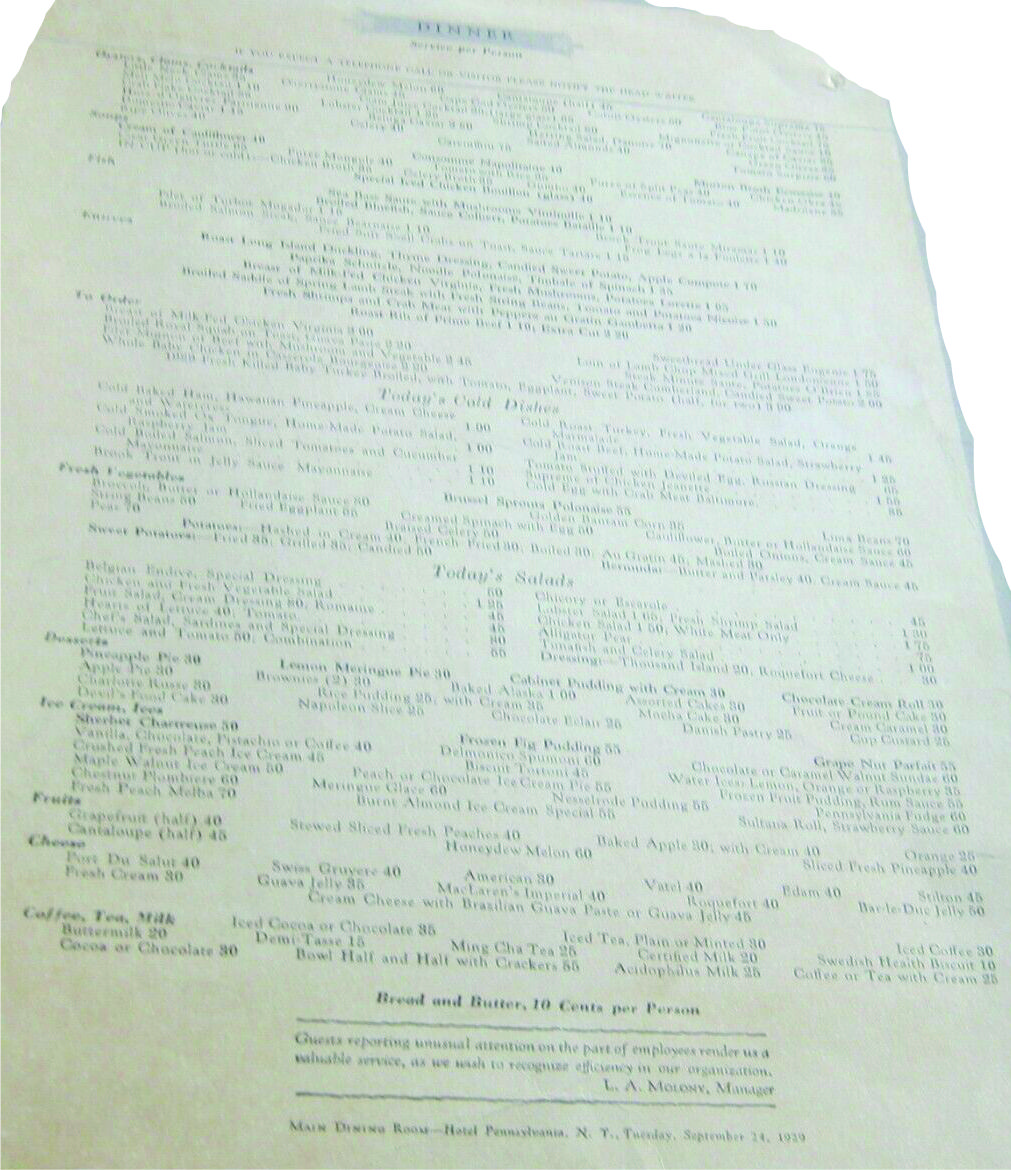
1929 Hotel Pennsylvania (NYC) Menu "Chef's Salad"

== See also ==
- List of salads
- Cobb salad
