= Red-black =

Red-black or Redblack may refer to:

- Ottawa Redblacks, a Canadian football team
- Red/black concept, a concept in cryptography
- Red-black striped snake, a colubrid snake
- Red–black tree, a type of self-balancing binary search tree used in computer science

== See also ==
- Black and Red (disambiguation)
- Red and Black (disambiguation)
