= DeLuxe Bar and Grill =

Restaurant in Seattle, Washington, U.S.

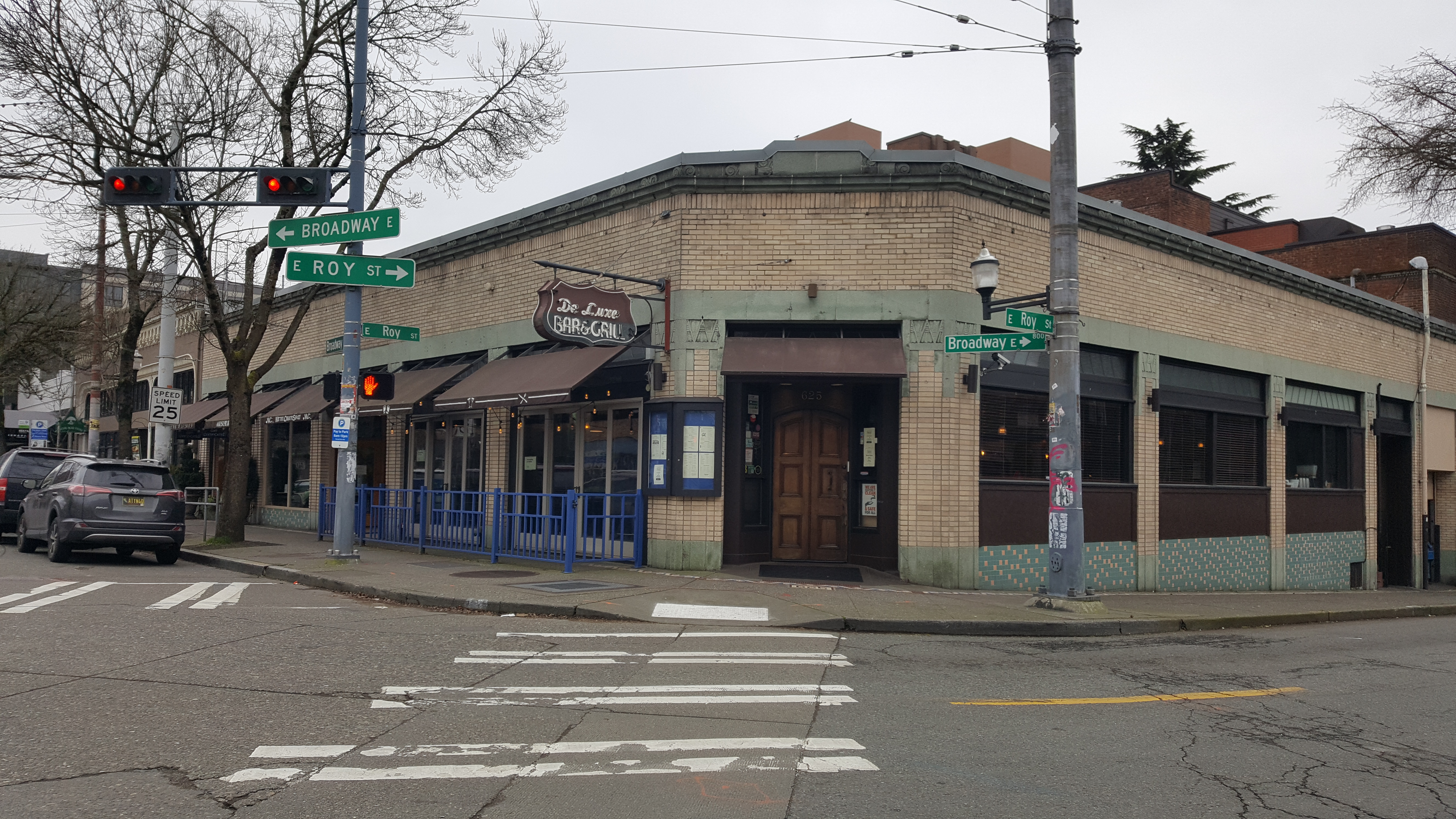
- The restaurant's exterior in 2022
- Interactive map of DeLuxe Bar and Grill

Restaurant information
- Food type: American
- Location: 625 Broadway E, Seattle, Washington, 98102, United States
- Coordinates: 47.6250°N 122.3213°W
- Website: deluxebarandgrill.com

DeLuxe Bar and Grill is a restaurant in Seattle's Capitol Hill neighborhood, in the United States.

== Description ==
Seattle Metropolitan has described DeLuxe as "Broadway's veteran, with a 40-plus year history of serving burgers to the people". The menu has included burgers and sandwiches, fish and chips, a Cobb salad with chicken, a Vietnam Chop Chop salad, and baked potatoes. The Bour B-Q burger has a prime beef patty with smoked cheddar and bourbon barbecue sauce, and is served with onion rings and coleslaw. The happy hour menu has included quesadillas (including Southwest crab and vegetable varieties) served with salsa and sour cream, sliders, black bean nachos, spinach and artichoke dip, and microbrews.

== History ==
The business has operated at the same location for decades.

== Reception ==
In 2011, Tan Vinh of The Seattle Times recommended the burger on the happy hour menu. Mark Van Streefkerk included DeLuxe in Eater Seattle's 2022 list of "11 Great Seattle Spots for Elaborate Nonalcoholic Drinks".
