= The Red and the Black (disambiguation) =

The Red and the Black is a novel by Stendhal.

The Red and the Black may also refer to:

- The Red and the Black (1954 film), a French film
- The Red and the Black (1985 film), a Croatian film
- "The Red and the Black", a 1973 song by Blue Öyster Cult from the album Tyranny and Mutation
- "The Red and the Black", a 2015 song by Iron Maiden from the album The Book of Souls
- The Red and the Black (album), the 1981 LP from Jerry Harrison of Talking Heads
- "The Red and the Black" (The X-Files), a 1998 episode from The X-Files

== See also ==
- Red and Black (disambiguation)
- The Scarlet and the Black (disambiguation)
