= Red and black =

Red and black may refer to:

== Media ==
- The Red & Black (University of Georgia), the student newspaper at the University of Georgia
- Red & Black (Washington & Jefferson College), the student newspaper at Washington & Jefferson College

== Cards ==
- Red and Black (solitaire), a patience game
- Rouge et Noir (patience) (French for Red and Black), a different patience game
- Red and black (card trick)

== Other ==
- Red and Black Cafe, a coffee shop in Portland, Oregon
- RED/BLACK concept, in cryptography
- Red–black tree, a data structure
- "Red and Black", a song from the 1980 musical Les Miserables
- The red and black banner a symbol of anarcho-syndicalism and anarcho-communism
- Red and Black Flags

== Other uses ==
- The Red and the Black, a 1830 novel by the French author Stendhal
- Red and Black (film), a 1955 Italian film

== See also ==
- Red and Black Light, a 2015 album by Ibrahim Maalouf
- Black and Red (disambiguation)
- Black (disambiguation)
- Red (disambiguation)
- Red-black (disambiguation)
- The Red and the Black (disambiguation)
