= The Scarlet and the Black (disambiguation) =

The Scarlet and the Black is a 1983 film about the story of Monsignor Hugh O'Flaherty.

It can also refer to:

- Scarlet and Black (TV series), a dramatization of the novel by Stendhal
- The Scarlet & Black, the college newspaper of Grinnell College, Iowa
- Scarlett and Black, a UK pop duo from the 1980s

== See also ==
- The Red and the Black, the novel by Stendhal
- Red and black (disambiguation)
