= Bowl =

Round, open-top container frequently used as tableware

Chinese bowl with decoration of the "Three Friends"; 1426–1435 CE; porcelain with underglaze blue decoration; diameter: 30.2 cm; Cleveland Museum of Art (U.S.)

A bowl is a typically round dish or container generally used for preparing, serving, storing, or consuming food. The interior of a bowl is characteristically shaped like a spherical cap, with the edges and the bottom, forming a seamless curve. This makes bowls especially suited for holding liquids and loose food, as the contents of the bowl are naturally concentrated in its center by the force of gravity. The exterior of a bowl is typically round but may vary in shape, including rectangular designs.

The size of bowls varies from small bowls used to hold a single serving of food to large bowls, such as punch bowls or salad bowls, that are often used to hold or store more than one portion of food. There is some overlap between bowls, cups, and plates. Very small bowls, such as the tea bowl, are often called cups, while plates with especially deep wells are often called bowls.

In many cultures, bowls are the most common kind of vessel used for serving and eating food. Historically, small bowls were also used for serving both tea and alcoholic drinks. In Western culture plates and cups are more commonly used.

== Background ==
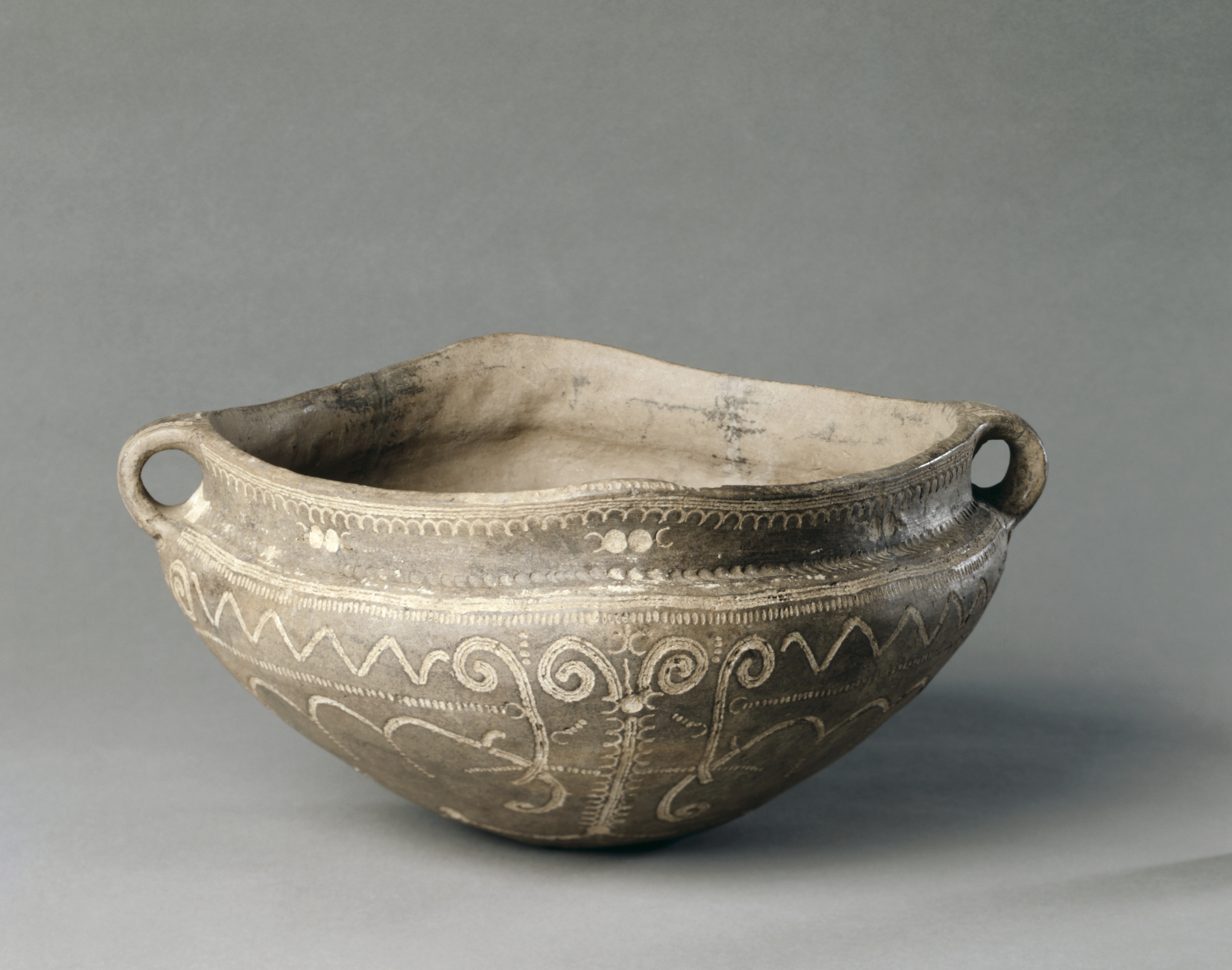
Romanian large bowl from the Middle Bronze Age; c. 1550 BC; burnished earthenware; overall: 15.5 × 31.3 cm; Cleveland Museum of Art (U.S.)

Modern bowls can be made of ceramic, metal, wood, plastic, and other materials. Bowls have been made for thousands of years. Very early bowls have been found in China, Ancient Greece, Crete and in certain Native American cultures.

In Ancient Greek pottery, small bowls, including phiales and pateras, and bowl-shaped cups called kylices were used. Phiales were used for libations and included a small dent in the center for the bowl to be held with a finger, although one source indicates that these were used to hold perfume rather than wine. Some Mediterranean examples from the Bronze Age manifest elaborate decoration and sophistication of design. For example, the bridge spouted vessel design appeared at the Minoan site of Phaistos. In the 4th millennium BC, evidence exists that the Uruk culture of ancient Mesopotamia mass-produced beveled rim bowls of standardized sizes. Moreover, in Chinese pottery, there are many elaborately painted bowls and other vessels dating to the Neolithic period. As of 2009, the oldest bowl found is 18,000 years old.

In examining bowls found during an archaeological dig in North America, the anthropologist Vincas Steponaitis defines a bowl by its dimensions, writing that a bowl's diameter rarely falls under half its height and that historic bowls can be classified by their edge, or lip, and shape.

== Communal bowl ==
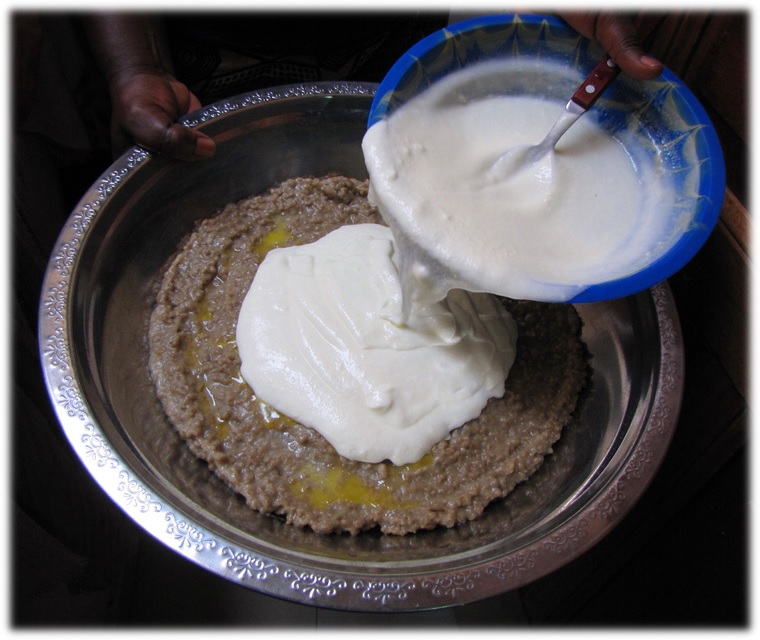
Lakh, a rolled flour porridge in a communal platter served topped with sweetened sour milk.

In many cultures, food and drink are shared in a communal bowl or cup. In Mali, the name of the town of Bandiagara (French pronunciation: [bɑ̃djaɡaʁa]) refers to the communal bowl meals are served in. The name translates roughly to "large eating bowl." In Zimbabwe, sadza is traditionally eaten from a communal bowl, a tradition that is still maintained by some families, mainly in rural areas. Lakh is a popular boiled porridge made with rolled millet flour pellets (araw/arraw) typically topped at serving with sweetened fermented milk. It is usually served in a communal bowl or platter in Senegal.

In some cultures, the communal bowl has a set of social strictures. The Spanish idiom, "¿Cuándo hemos comido en el mismo plato?" (transl. "When have we eaten from the same dish?") draws attention to Spanish cultural expectation about sharing communal dishes. In Chinese dining etiquette, plates are served communally but are expected to be served to personal plates, instead of eating directly from the communal dishes.

== Gallery ==
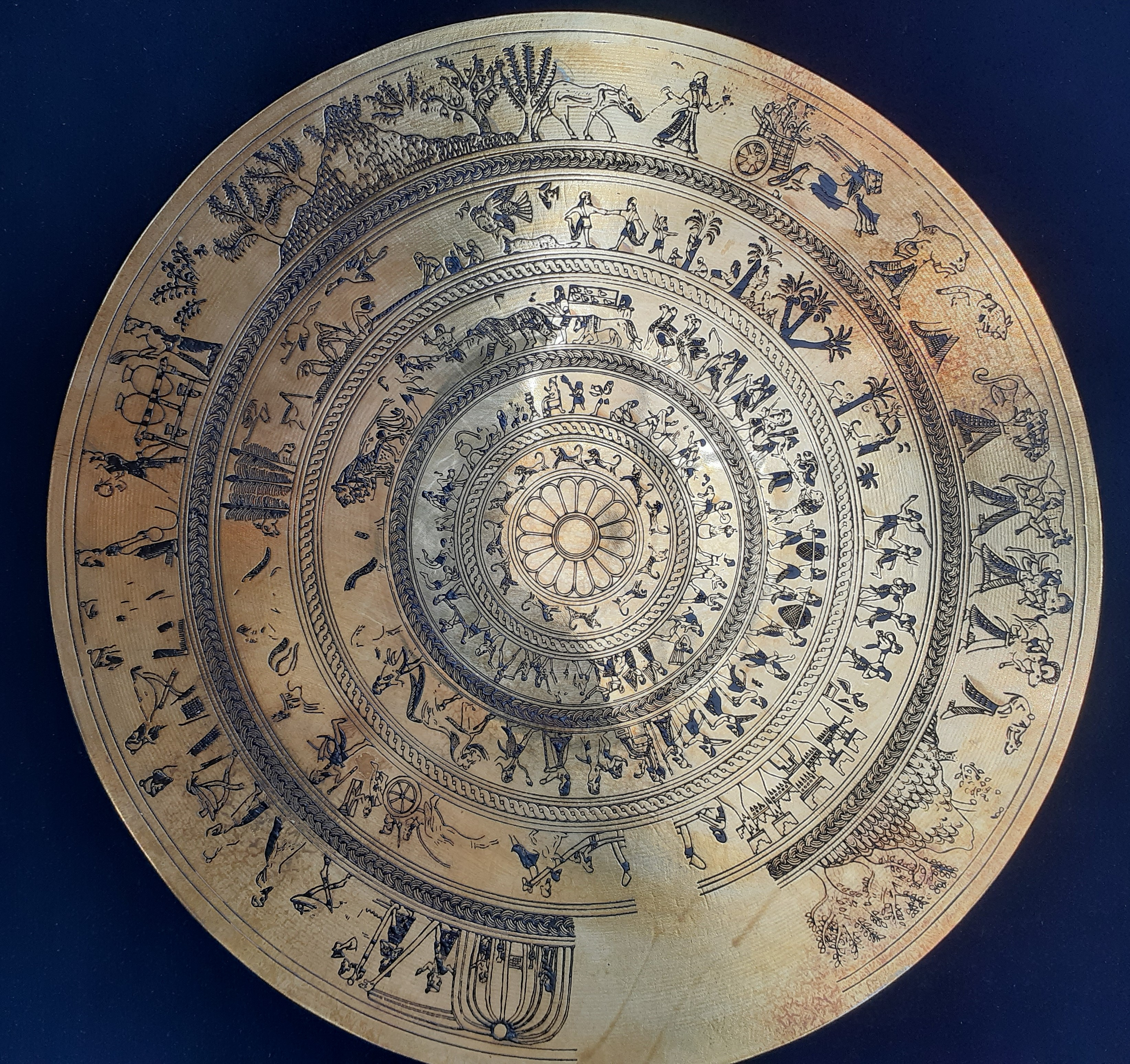
Ancient Iranian bowl called Jam-e Arjan

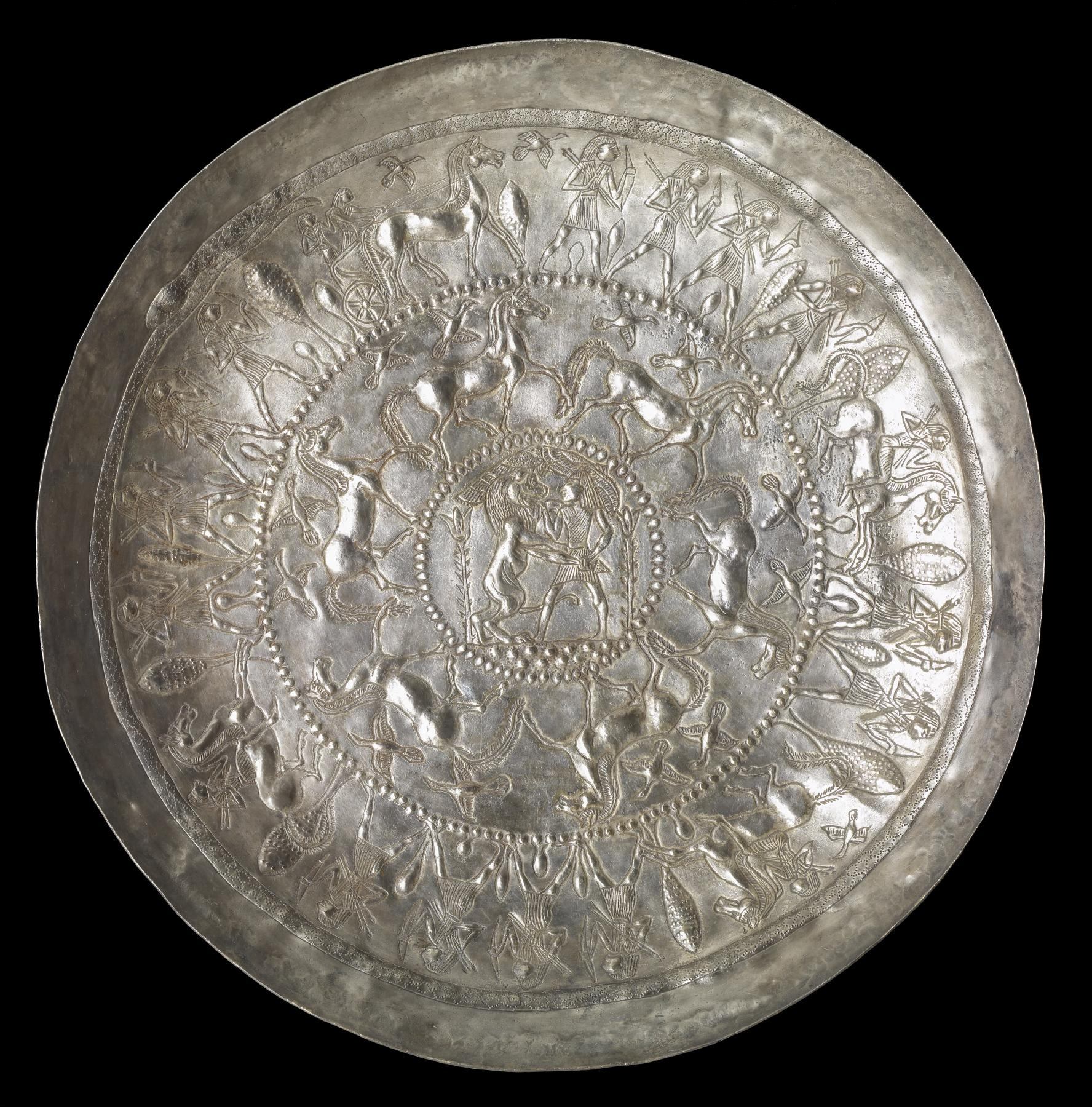
A Phoenician silver bowl showing a hunting scene, found in Palestrina

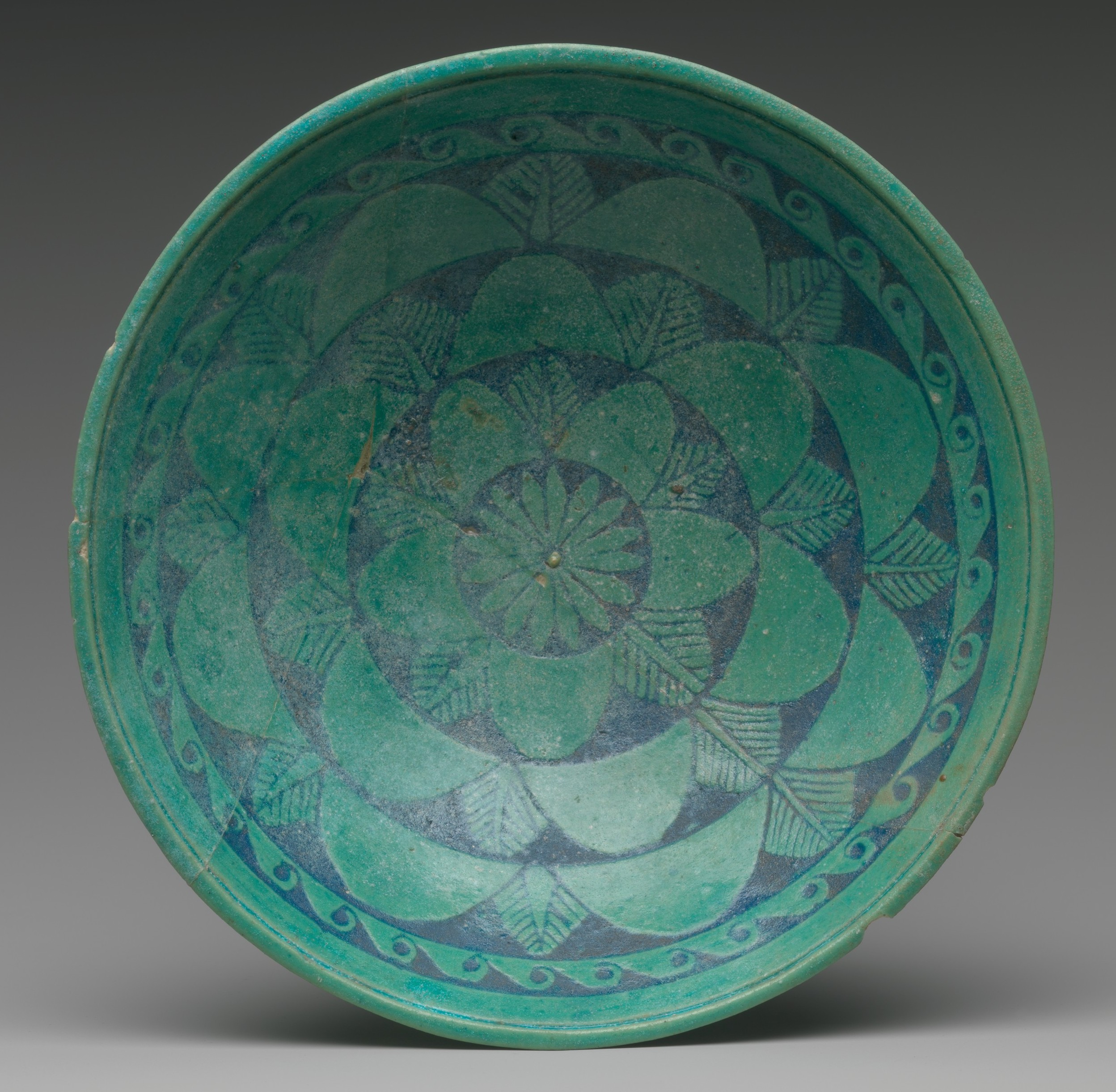
Ancient Egyptian bowl; 200–150 BC; faience; 4.8 cm × 16.9 cm (1.9 in × 6.7 in); Metropolitan Museum of Art (New York City)

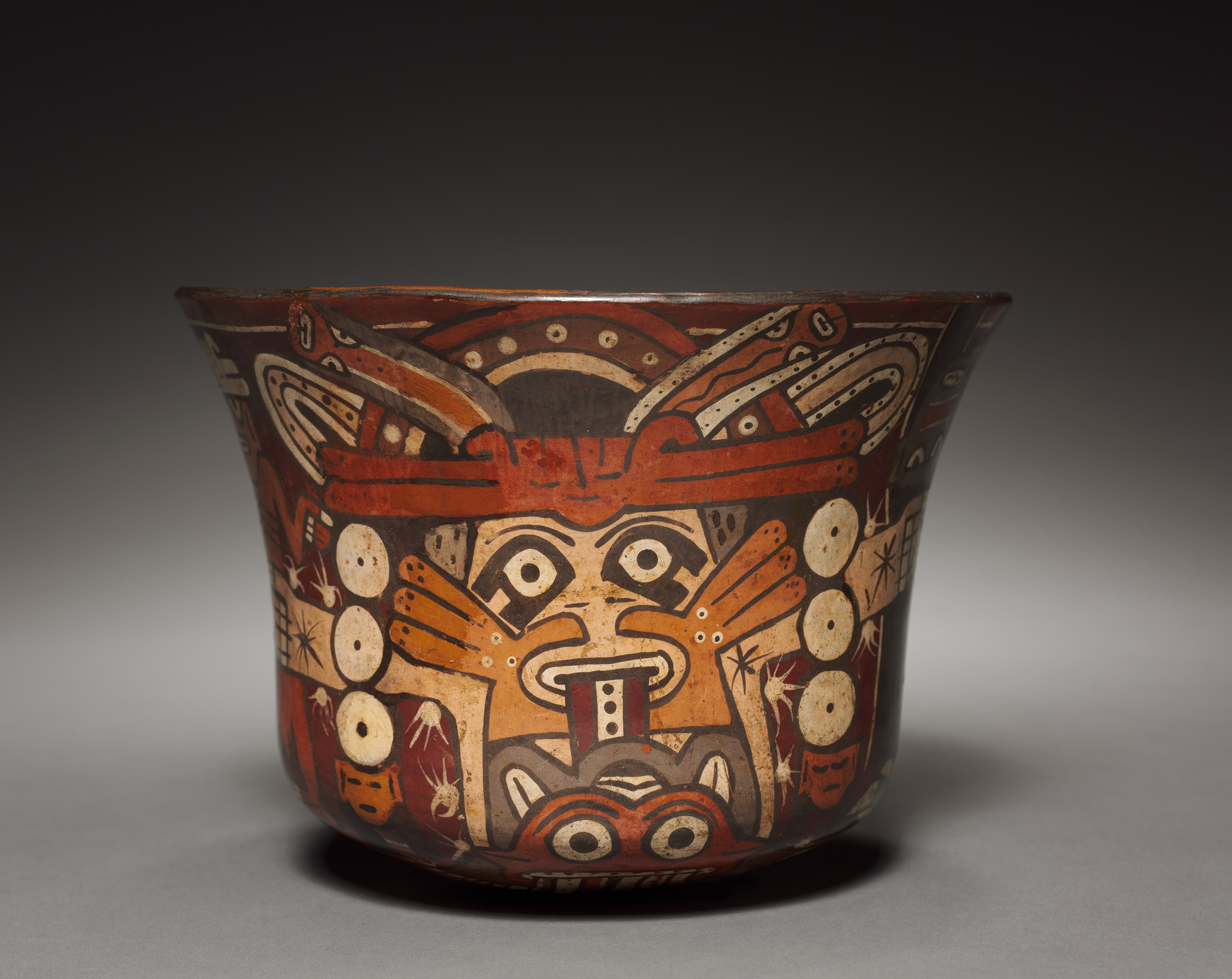
Nasca bowl; c. 100 BC; earthenware with colored slips; diameter: 12.8 × 17.7 cm; overall: 13 cm; from Peru; Cleveland Museum of Art (Cleveland, Ohio, U.S.)

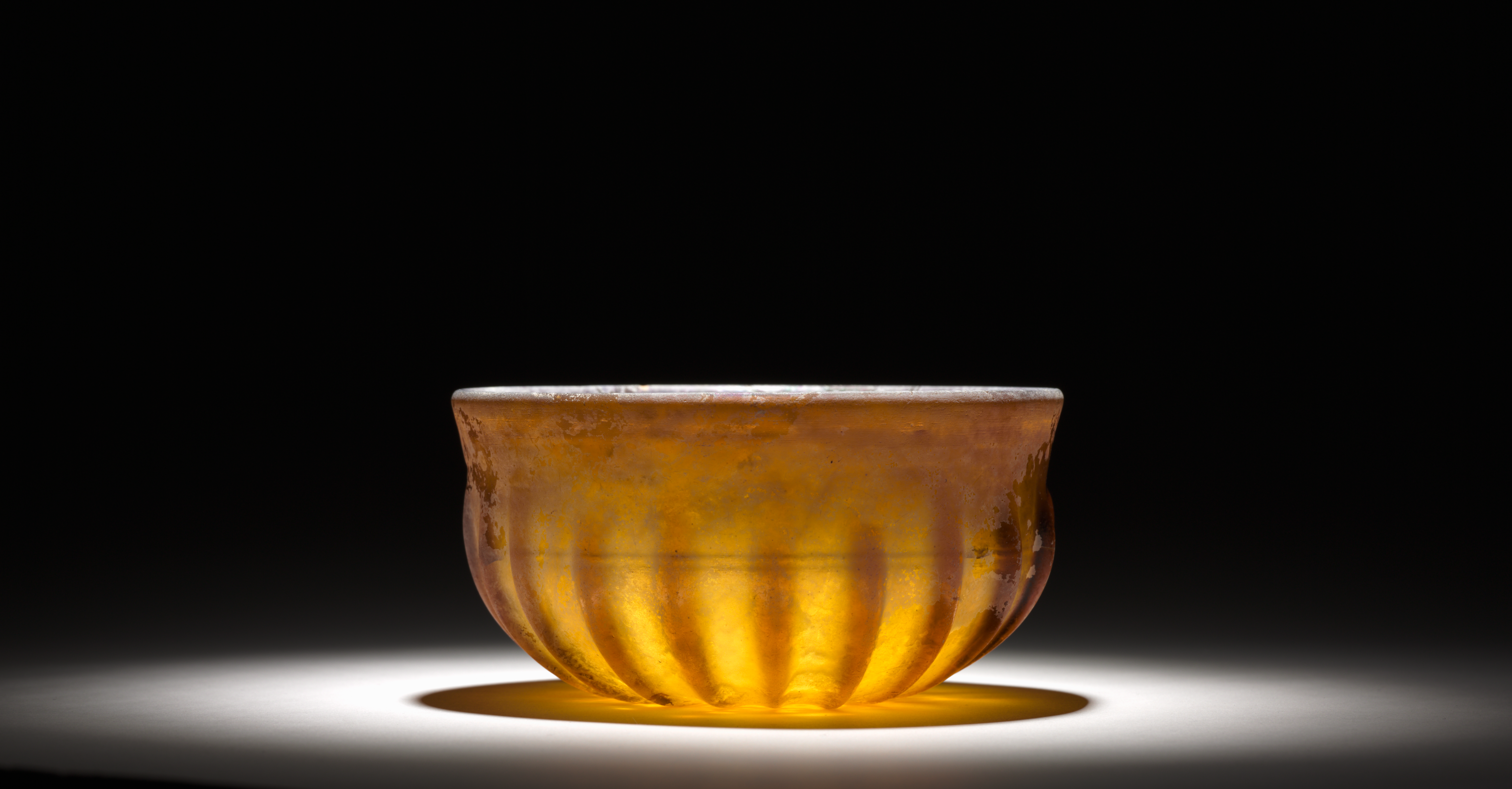
Roman ribbed bowl; 1st century AD; glass; diameter: 6.5 cm; Cleveland Museum of Art

Mogollon bowl with a pronghorn antelope and geometric designs; 1000–1150; earthenware; diameter: 31.2 cm, overall: 12.5 × 32 cm; Cleveland Museum of Art

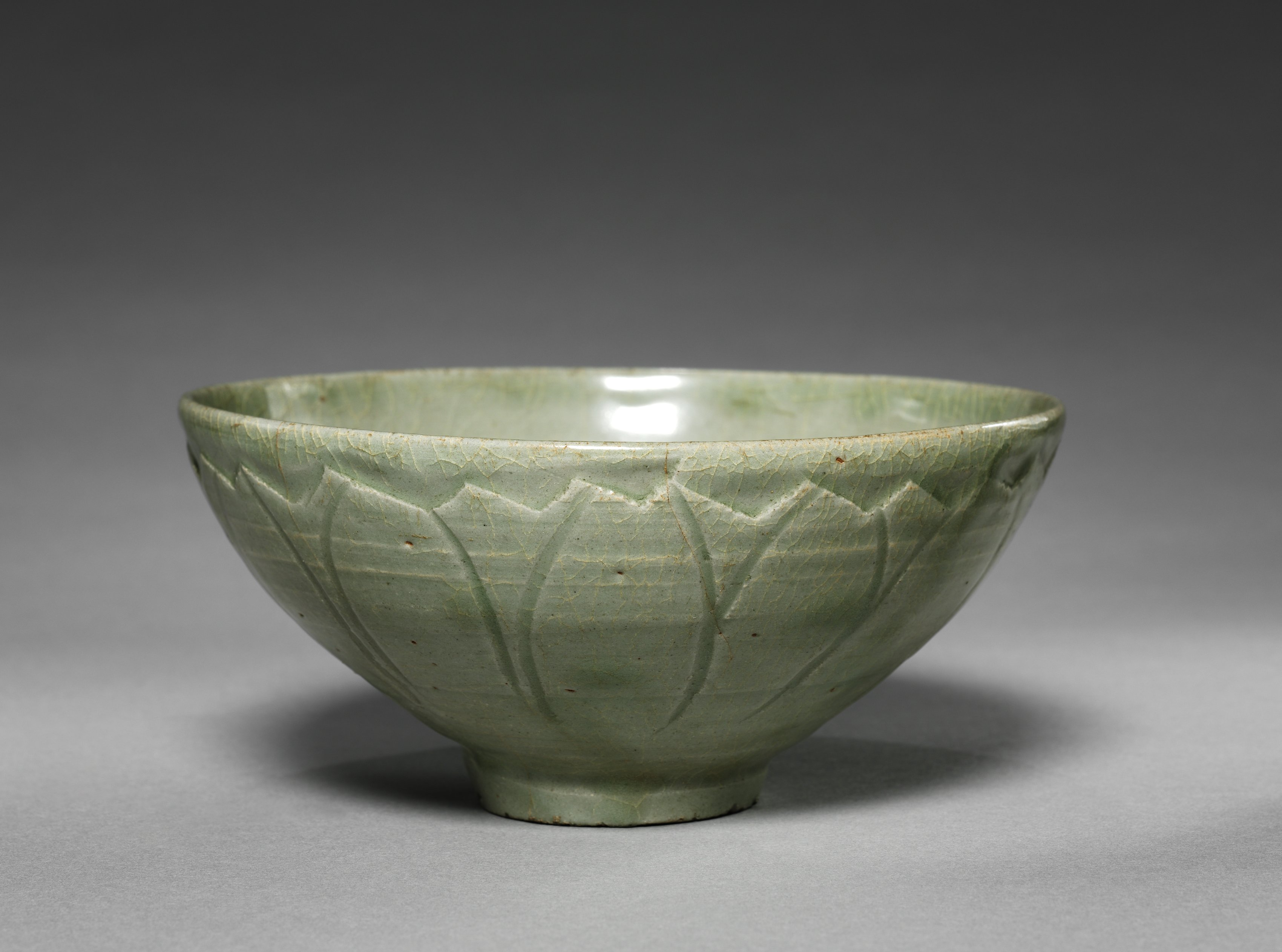
Korean bowl with a lotus petal design in relief; 1100 (Goryeo period); porcelain celadon ware; Cleveland Museum of Art

Chinese bowl; 1723–1735 (Qing dynasty); porcelain with doucai decoration; diameter: 11.8 cm, overall: 6.4 cm; from the Jiangxi province (China); Cleveland Museum of Art

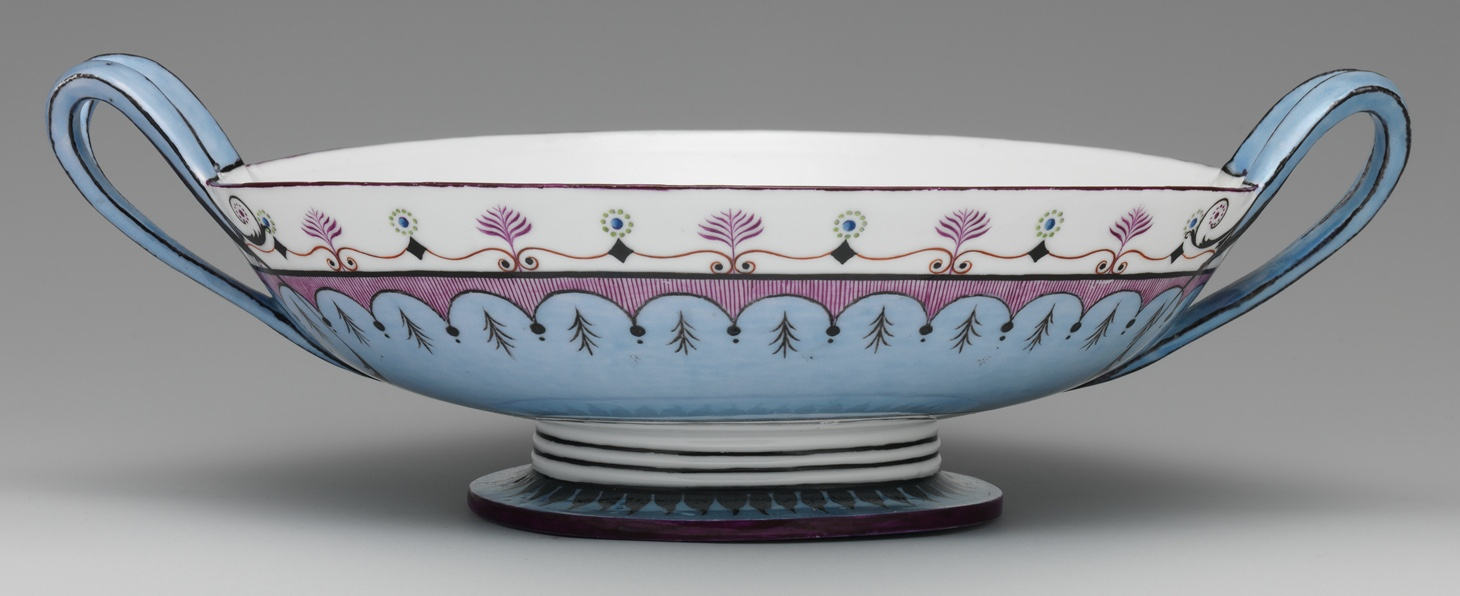
French Neoclassical bowl (jatte à anses relevées or jatte écuelle); 1787–1788; hard-paste porcelain; overall: 7.6 × 25.4 × 19.1 cm; Metropolitan Museum of Art

Bowl, part of an English dessert service; c. 1800; porcelain; diameter: 22.8 cm, overall: 5 cm; Cleveland Museum of Art

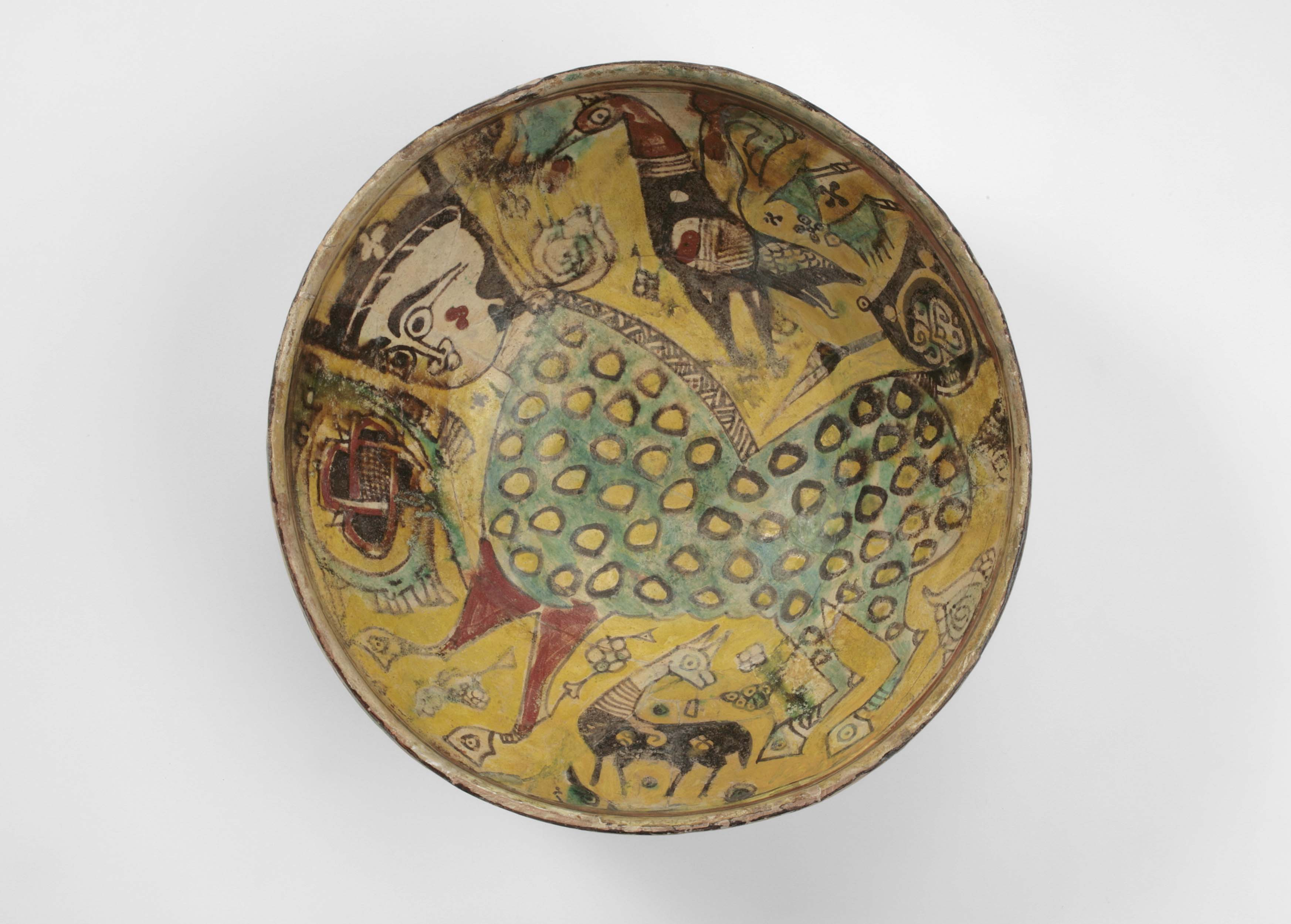
10th century bowl from Nishapur, Iran. Decorated in folk style, depicting Buraq. Khalili Collection.

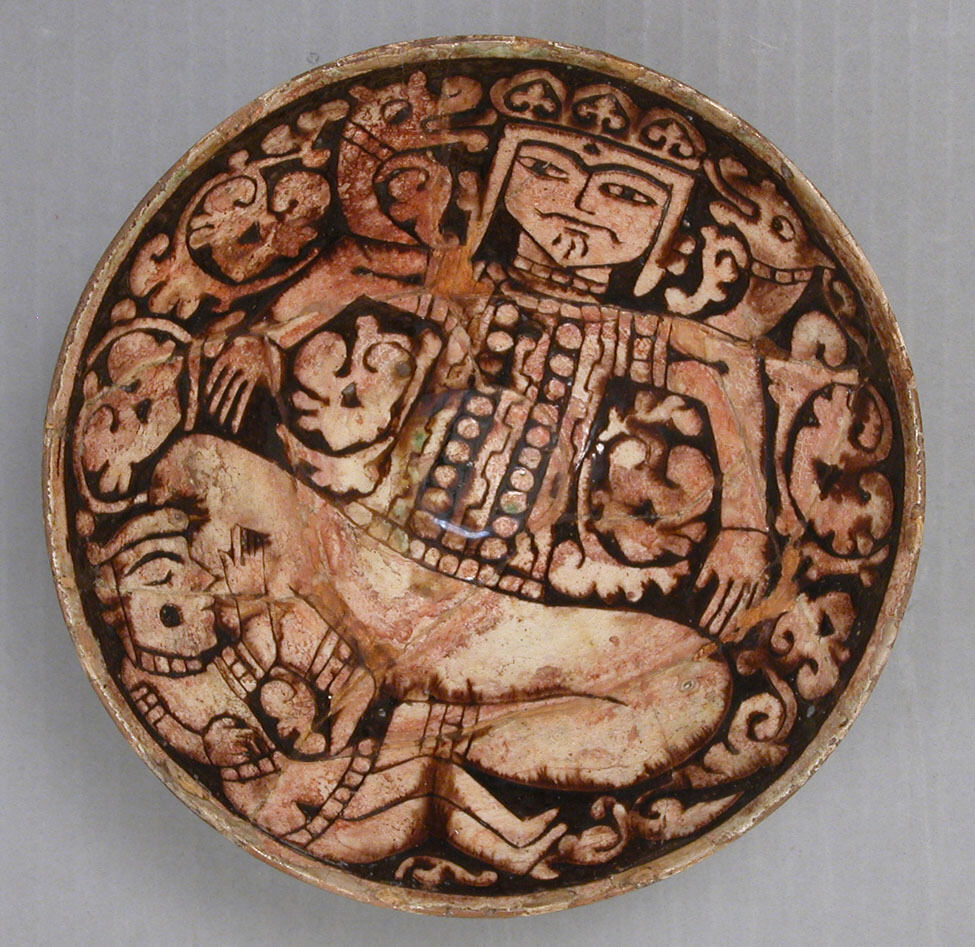
12th–13th century bowl depicting King Zahhak with snakes protruding from his shoulders, likely from Northwestern Iran. Modified c. 1926, as many medieval pieces were to make them more attractive.

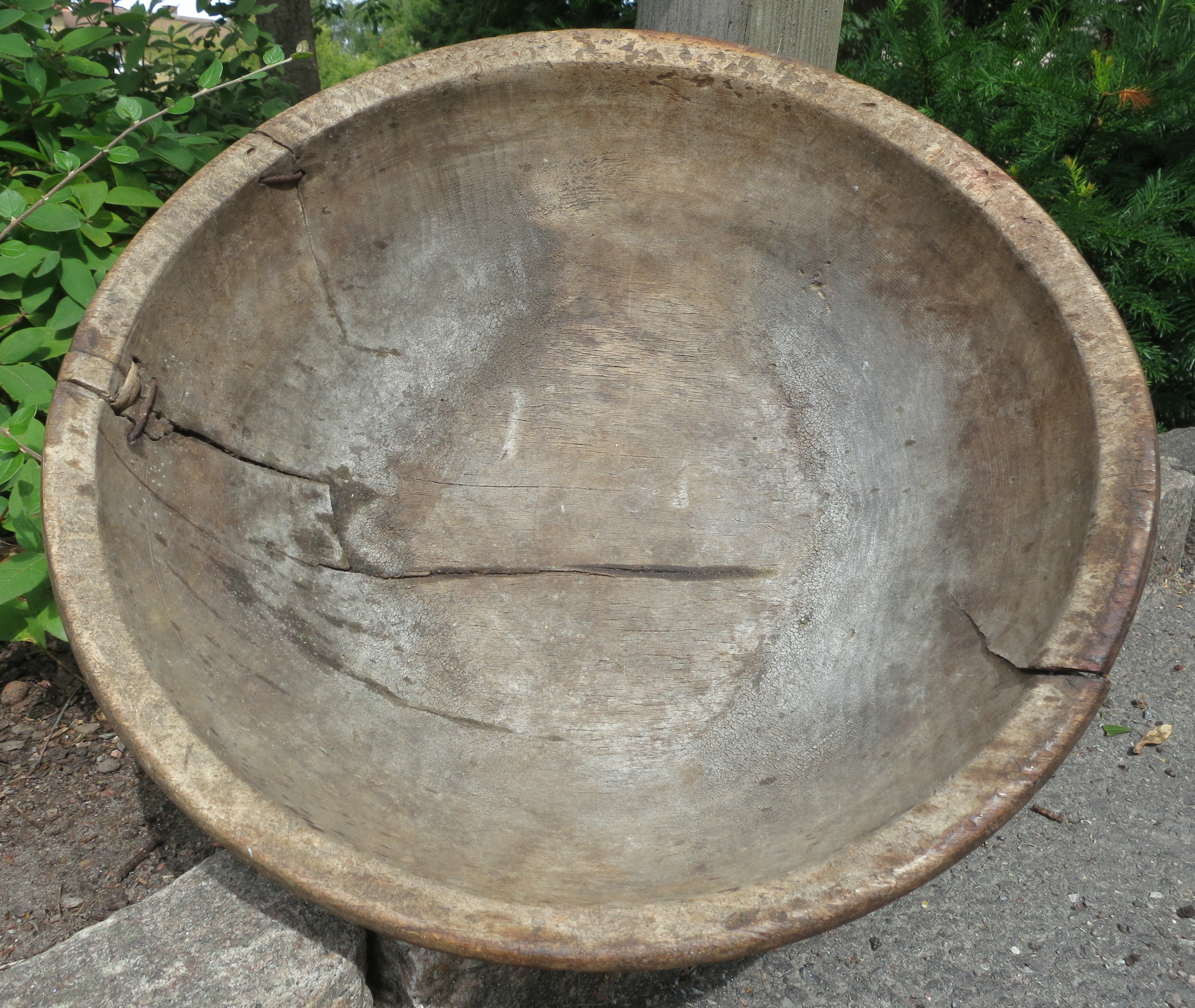
Late 19th century wooden bowl from Kungälv municipality, Sweden

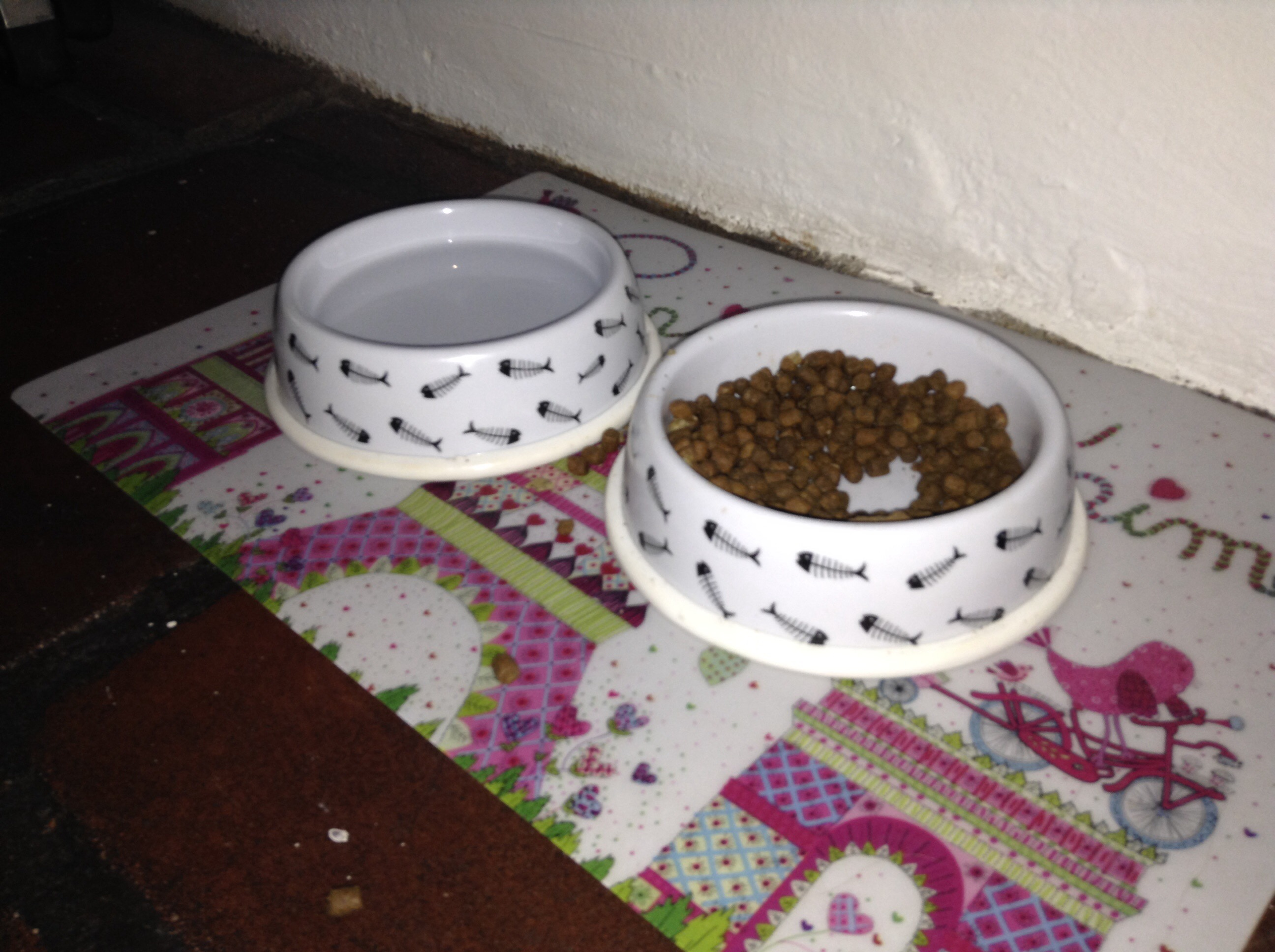
Pet bowls, which are designed to be used by domestic animals such as dogs or cats

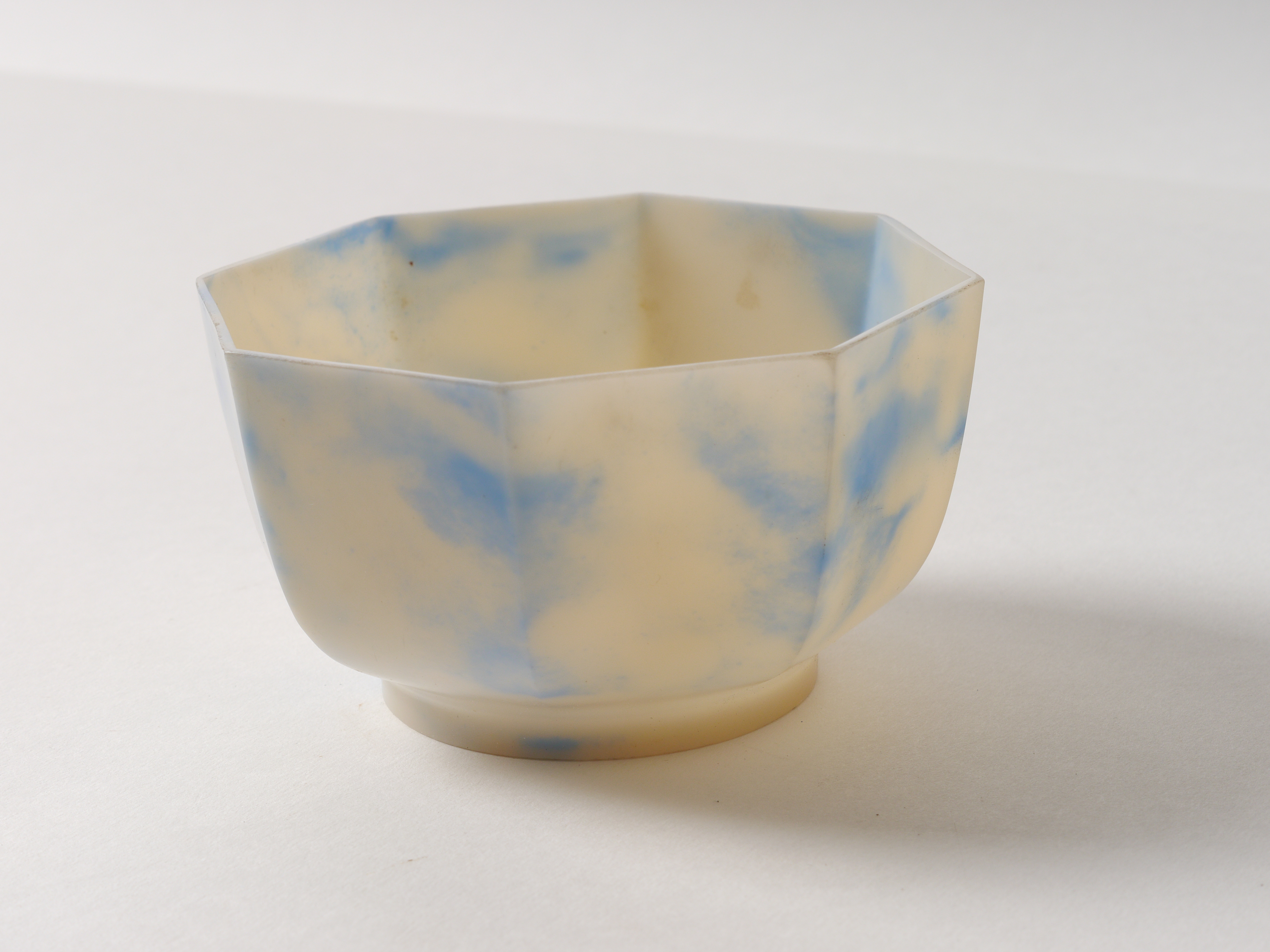
Bowl in urea-formaldehyde. Collection Museum of Industry Ghent.

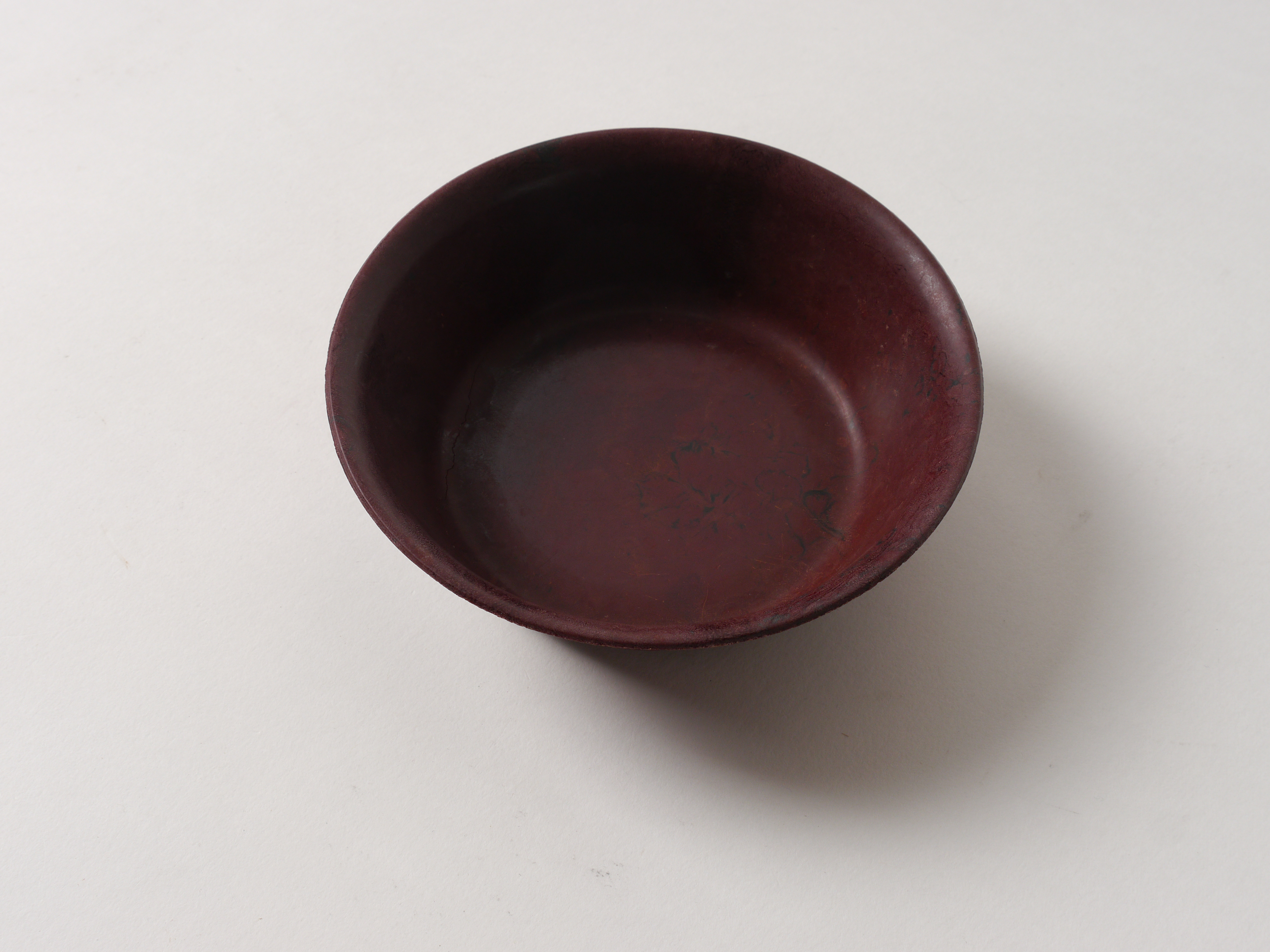
Round bowl in bakelite, collection Museum of Industry Ghent.

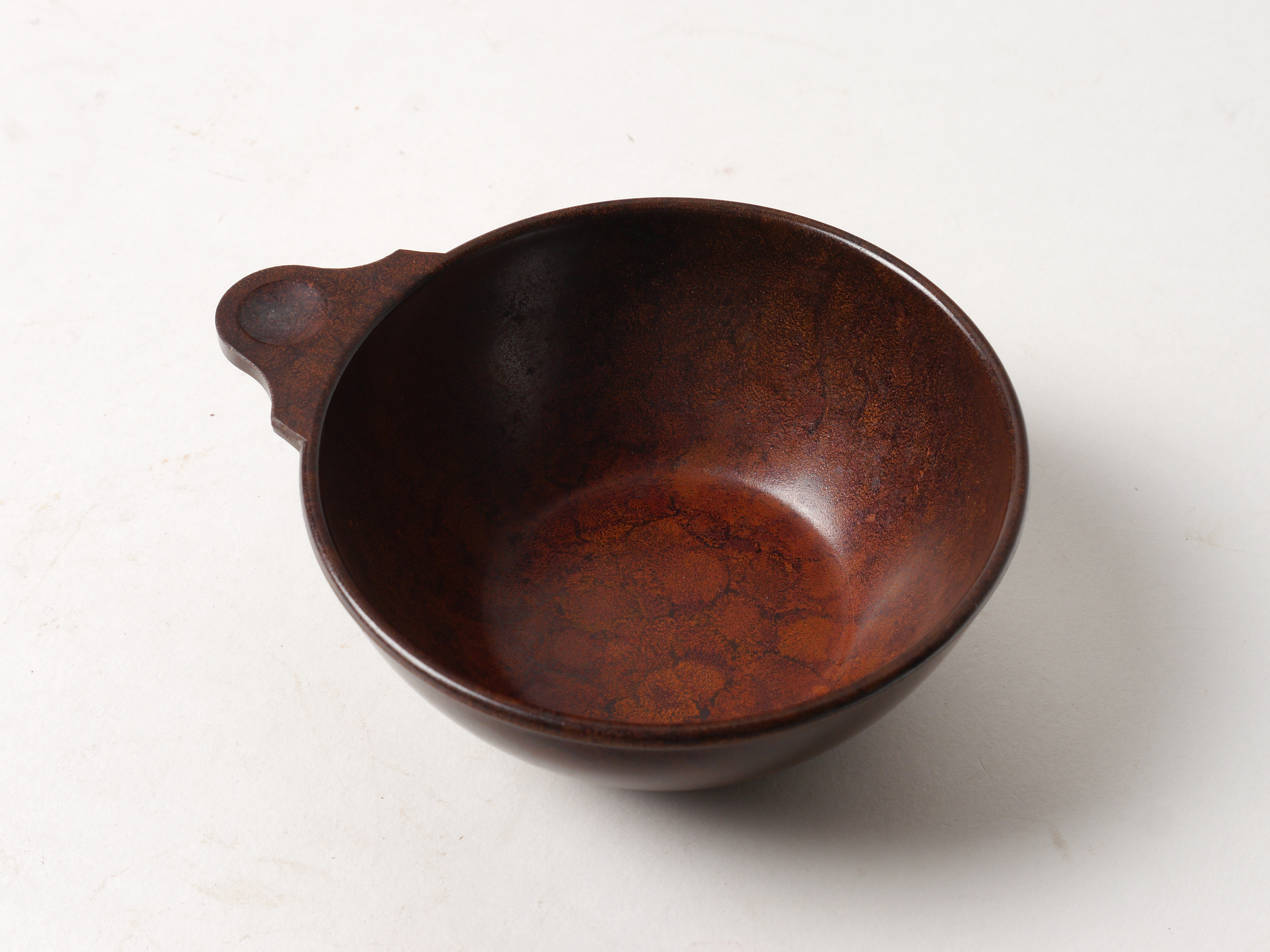
Shaving bowl in bakelite, collection Museum of Industry Ghent.

== See also ==
- Bridge spouted vessel
- Buffet
- Dishware
- List of eating utensils
