= Rolled flour porridge =

Type of African porridge

Rolled flour porridge (Bambara: fini môni; in Guinea, yefouré, m'boyri) is a family of porridges in West African cuisine and South Sudanese cuisine made by boiling rolled flour - comparable to couscous - to produce a starchy porridge with boiled flour granules. Historically made from sorghum flour or millet flour, contemporary rolled flour porridges include maize flour and wheat flour.

== Preparation ==
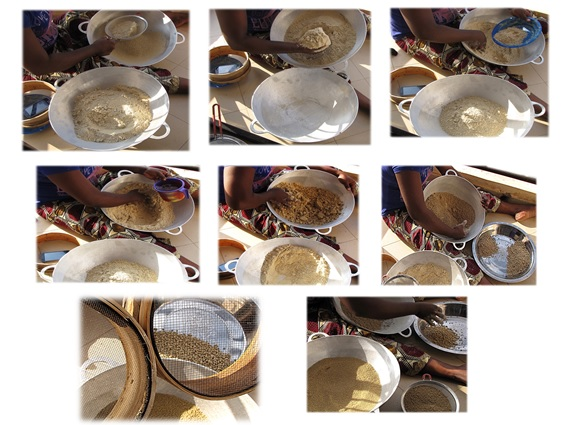
Process of rolling Millet flour

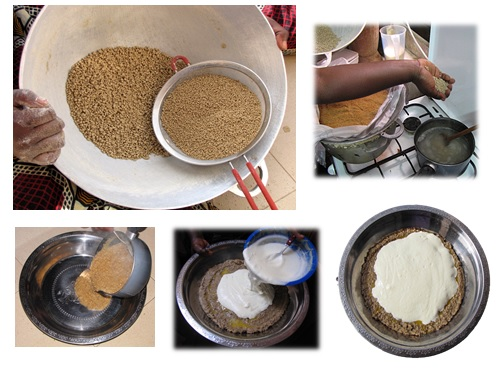
Preparation of lakh sow, left to right from top: sifting millet flour; boiling rolled flour; plating lakh; adding sow (cream); final

To produce the rolled flour (arraw), the flour is sieved and then water dribbled into the flour. The wet clumps are then worked into smaller balls, slowly creating semi-uniform granules. The rolled flour is then boiled, creating a thin, starchy porridge with small rolled flour morsels.

== Varieties ==
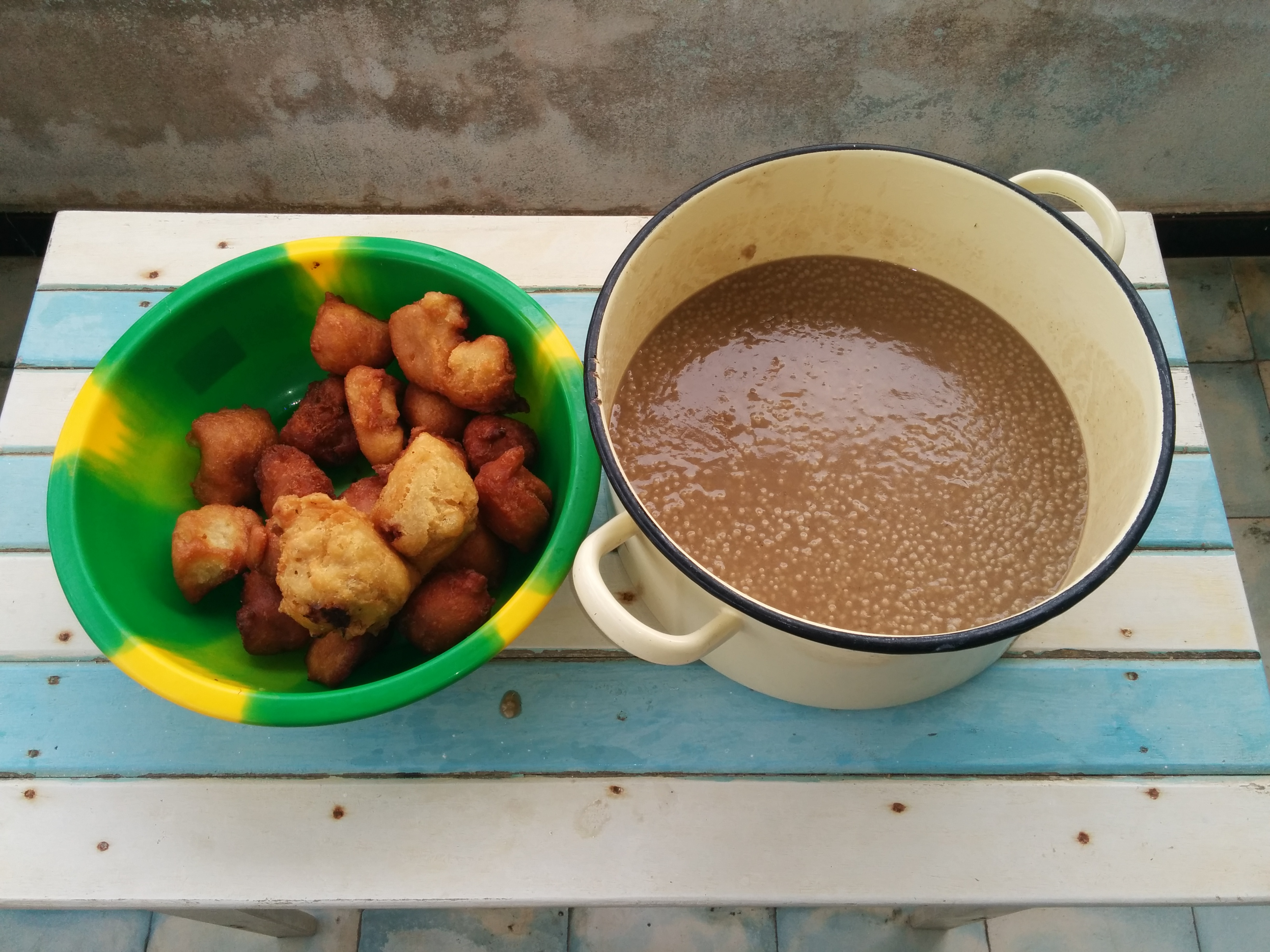
Rolled millet flour porridge with galettes, Ivorian cuisine

Rolled millet porridge (Bambara: moni kuru; French: Bouillie de mil; sanglé) is eaten throughout West African cuisine. A staple food, it is also used to break fasts across both Islamic fasts and Christian fasts.

=== Aklui ===
In Togolese cuisine, aklui (Gen: aklui zogbon, Gun: aklui coco) is a rolled fermented maize flour porridge. Aklui is a staple food and common breakfast item. It is usually topped with peanuts and pared with a botokoin, a variety of donut; it may be flavored with lemongrass.

=== Lakh ===
Lakh araw (Wolof/Fula) is a Senegalese and Gambian cuisine rolled millet porridge with sugar and sour milk. The dish is called lakh sow when cream is added on top. A further variant is ngalakh, a lakh which is topped with njineh jobe, a sauce made from baobab fruit (bouye; French: pain de singe, lit. 'monkey bread'), peanut paste, vanilla and orange blossom. Ngalakh in particular is eaten on special occasions: it is a common fixture of naming ceremonies and weddings; Senegalese Muslims eat it during Ramadan for iftar and on Eid al-Fitr; and Senegalese Catholics have ngalakh to break the Friday fast for Good Friday, and further enjoy it through Easter.

=== Rice pap ===
Rice pap is a rolled rice flour porridge of Sierra Leone. It is typically eaten for breakfast.

=== Walwal ===
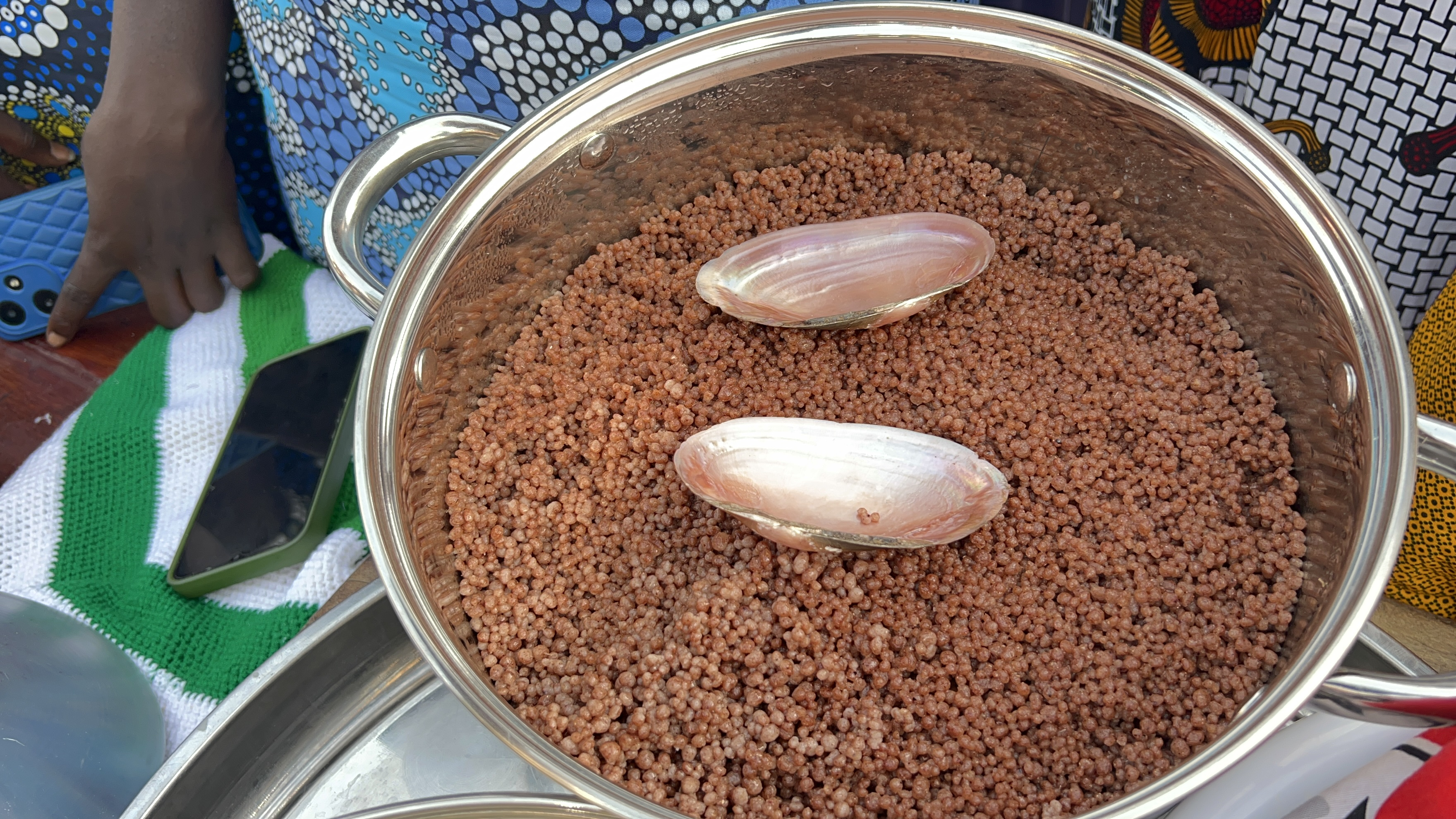
Akof, a South Sudanese cuisine sorphum/millet couscous; walwal is boiled into a porridge instead of being steamed as akof

Walwal (Nuer; abyei) is a rolled millet or sorghum flour porridge from South Sudanese cuisine. It is a staple food for all meals of the day; the rolled flour steamed on its own is called akof, a couscous. Additions to walwal include the bitter fruit of the lalob, clarified butter, and milk.

== Gallery ==
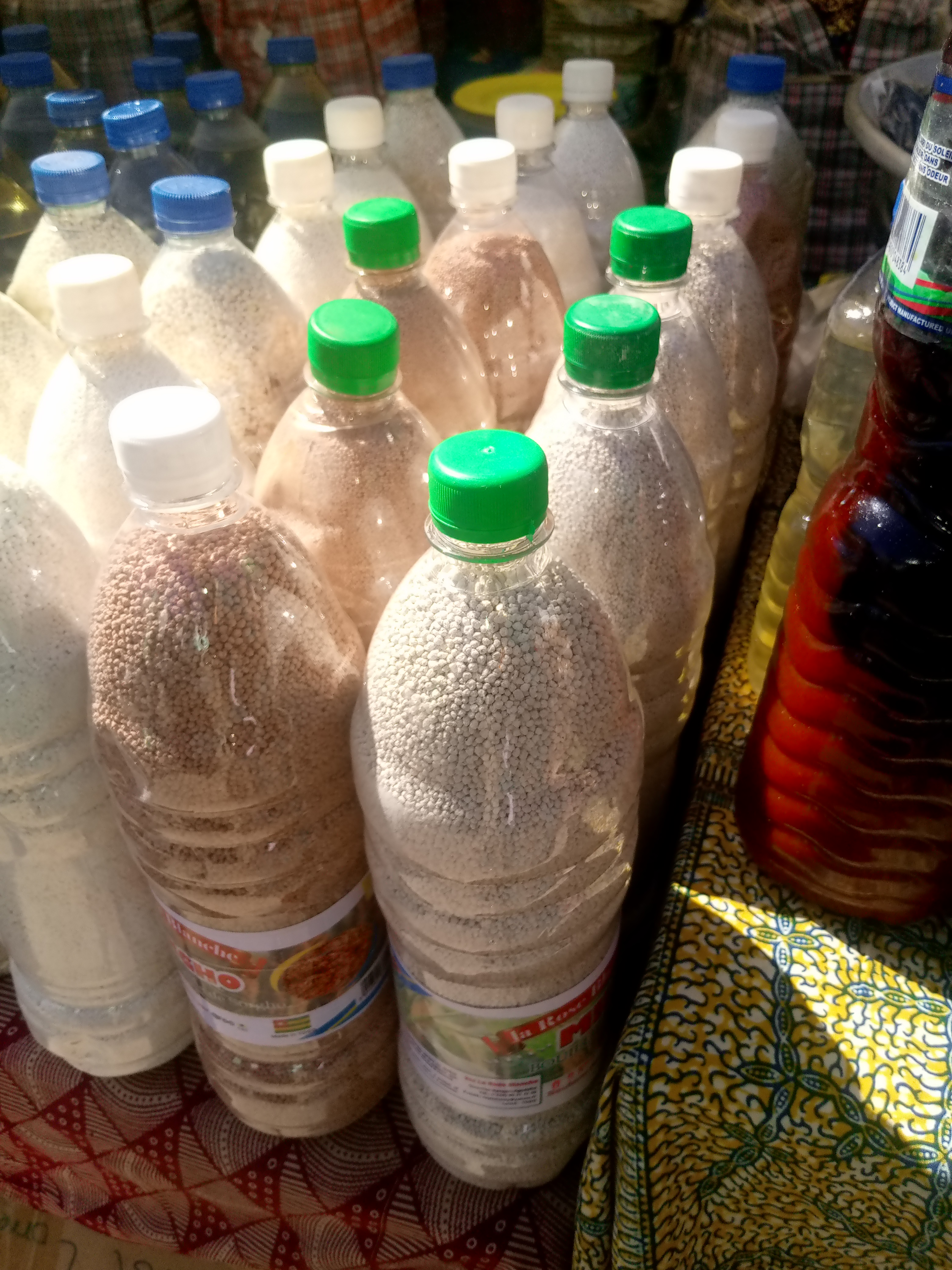
Bottles of rolled flour at market

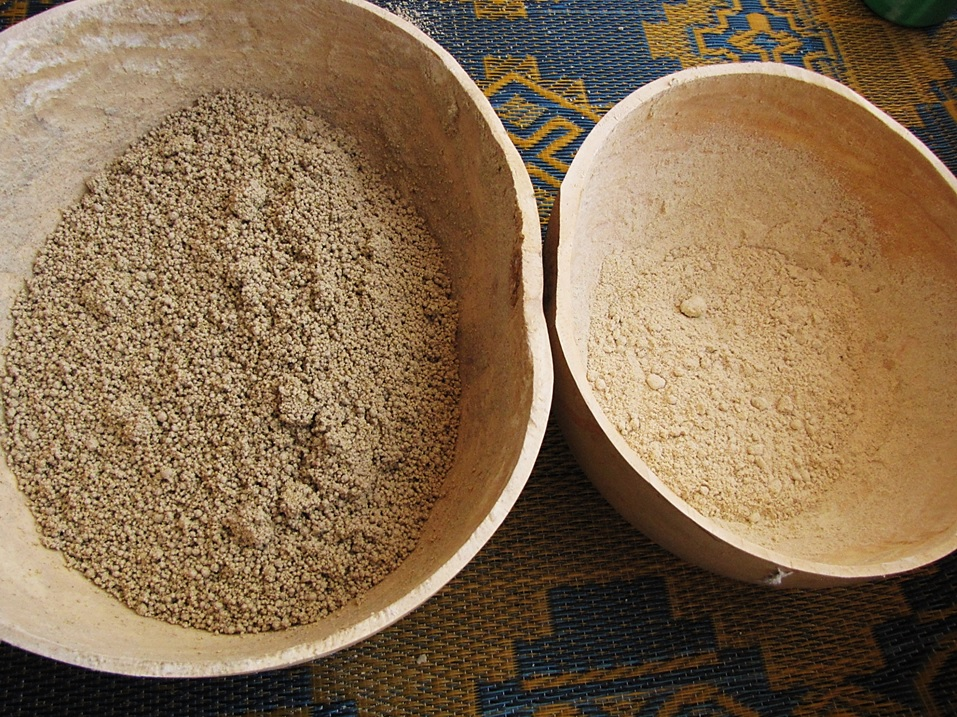
Flour in calabash bowls; raw at right, rolled at left

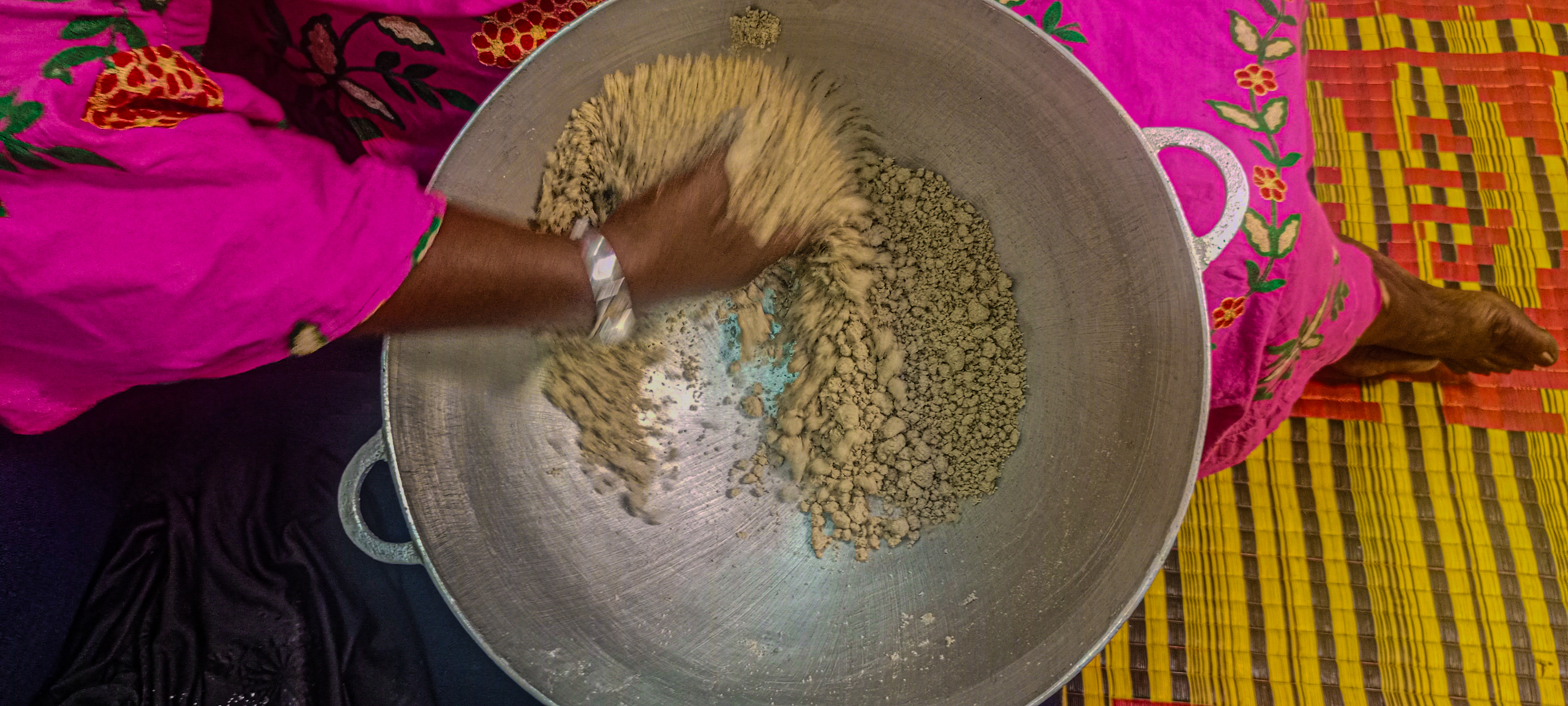
Rolling Millet flour

== See also ==
- Chakery, a West African dessert made from steamed rolled flour
- La bouillie (Chadian food)
