= Red and Black (card game) =

- Type: Simple packer
- Family: Napoleon at St Helena
- Deck: Double 52-card

Red and Black is a patience or card solitaire which uses two decks of playing cards. The game is called so because all building is done in alternating colors of red and black. It is not related to another similarly named solitaire game of Rouge et Noir (French for red and black), although Red and Black can also be known under that name. It is a part of the Napoleon at St Helena family of patiences and solitaires.

The earliest account is given by "Tarbart" in 1905. The rules presented here are those provided in Lee and Packard's book 100 Best Solitaire Games (2015).

== Rules ==
First, the eight aces are taken out of the stock to act as the foundations. Then eight cards are dealt under the aces to become the bases for the tableau columns.

The top cards in the tableau are available for play to the foundations or to the other cards in the tableau. The foundations are built up (each up to Kings) while the cards on the tableau are built down, all by alternating color. Any spaces are immediately filled by the top card of the wastepile, or if none is present, the top card of the stock.

When there are no possible moves made from the tableau, the stock is dealt one card at a time onto the wastepile – the top card of which is available for play to the tableau or the foundations.

The game ends soon after the cards of the stock are dealt onto the wastepile. Ultimately, the game is won when all cards are built onto the waste pile.

== Variations ==
When popularly implemented in modern software suites, this game has the following common variations:

- Packed sequences can be moved as one unit.
- Spaces are filled by any available card or packed sequence.

== See also ==
- List of patiences and solitaires
- Glossary of patience and solitaire terms

== Bibliography ==
- Coops, Helen Leslie (1939). 100 Games of Solitaire. Whitman. 128 pp.
- Sloane Lee & Gabriel Packard (2015), 100 Best Solitaire Games. Las Vegas: Cardoza. ISBN 1-58042-115-6
- "Tarbart" (1905). Games of Patience. 2nd edn. De La Rue.
