= Cobb salad =

American garden salad

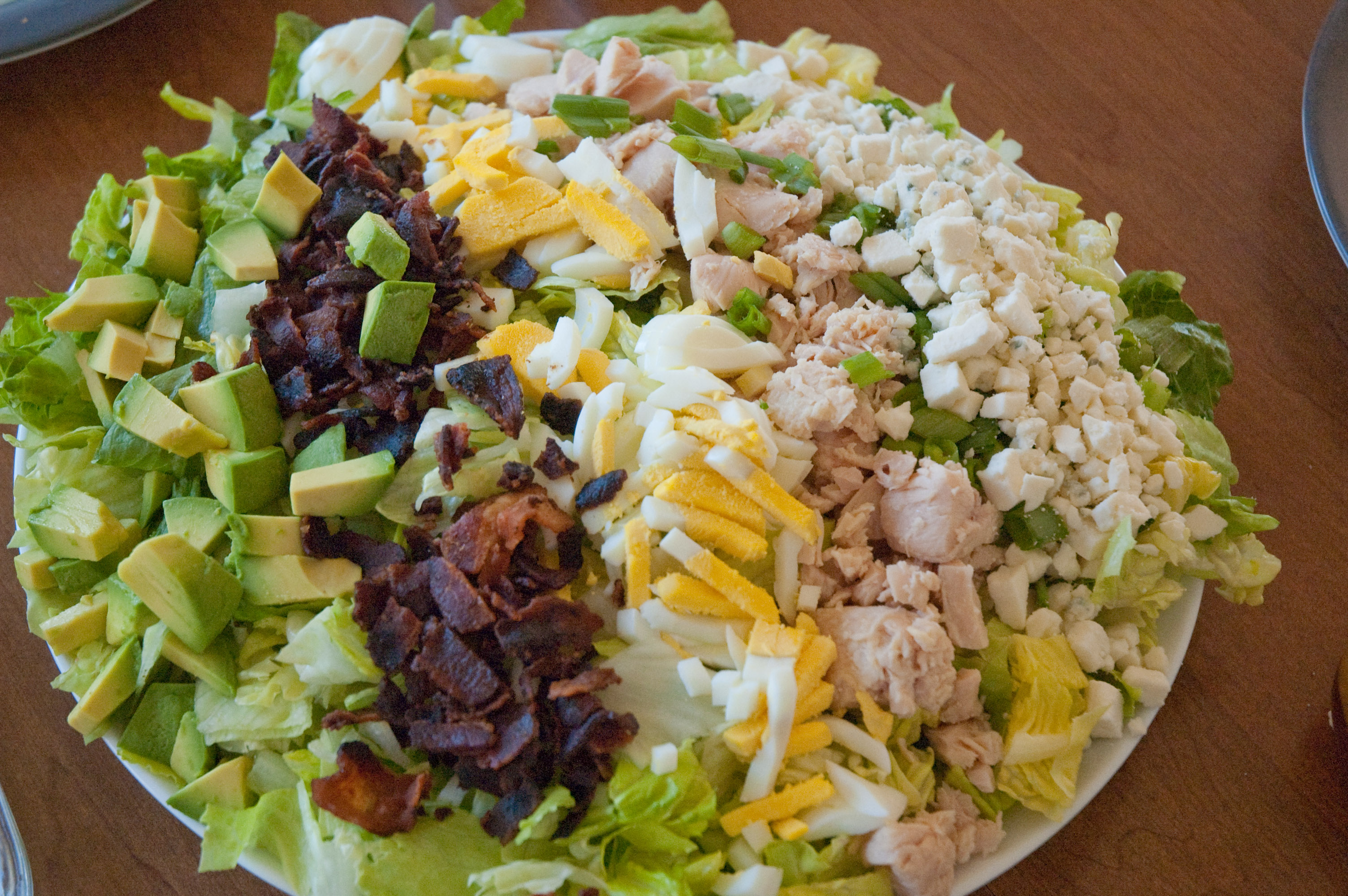
- Type: Salad
- Place of origin: United States
- Region or state: California
- Created by: Hollywood Brown Derby restaurant
- Main ingredients: Salad greens (iceberg lettuce, Romaine lettuce), tomatoes, bacon, chicken breast, hard-boiled eggs, blue cheese, red wine vinaigrette

The Cobb salad is an American salad typically made with chopped salad greens (authentically romaine lettuce), tomato, bacon, chicken breast, hard-boiled eggs, avocado, chives, blue cheese (often Roquefort; some versions use other cheeses such as cheddar or Monterey Jack, or no cheese at all) and red wine vinaigrette. The ingredients are laid out separately, often in neat rows. It is served as a main course.

== Origin ==
Various stories recount how the salad was invented. One says that it came about in 1937 at the Hollywood Brown Derby restaurant, where it became a signature dish. It is named after the restaurant's owner, Robert Howard Cobb. Stories vary whether the salad was invented by Cobb or by his chef, Paul J. Posti. The legend is that Cobb had not eaten until near midnight, and so he mixed together leftovers he found in the kitchen, along with some bacon cooked by the line cook, and tossed it with their French dressing.

Another version of this story is that Robert Cobb prepared it for showman and theater owner Sid Grauman. It was finely chopped, because Grauman had just had dental work done, and couldn't chew well.

Yet another version of the creation is that Robert Kreis, executive chef at the restaurant, created the salad in 1929 (the year the Brown Derby's Hollywood location opened) and named it in honor of Cobb. The same source confirms that 1937 was the reported date of the version noted above, with Cobb making the salad.

== See also ==
- List of foods named after people
- List of salads
- Cuisine of California
- Chef salad
