= Salad bowl =

Serving bowl for salad

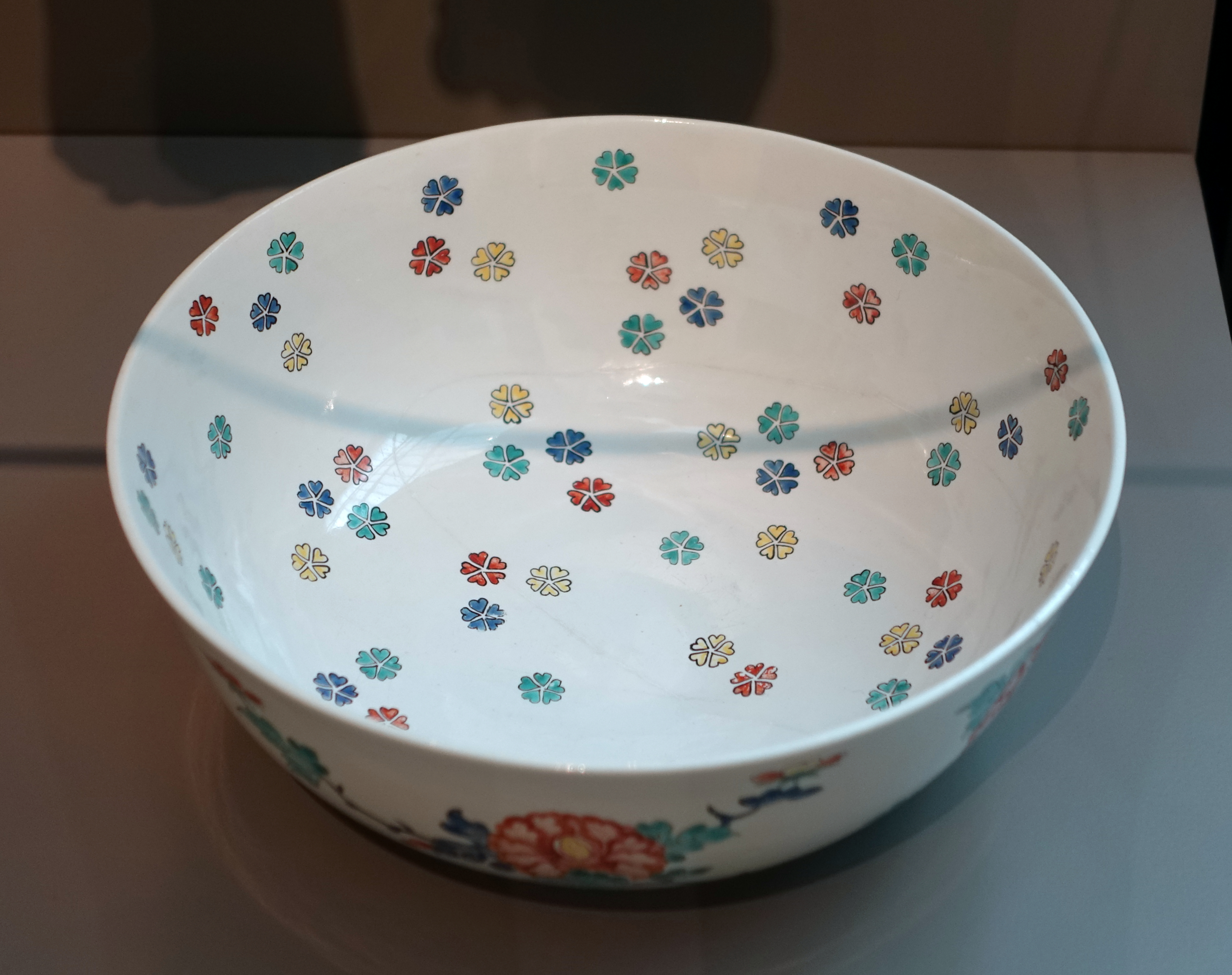
Salad bowl, Chantilly porcelain, c. 1735–1740, soft-paste porcelain

A salad bowl is a serving bowl for salads, especially tossed salads.

== Materials ==
Salad bowls may be made of any of the usual materials used for tableware, including ceramics, metal, plastic, glass, or wood. Salad bowls can also be made from renewable materials such as Poly-lactic Acid (PLA), wheat straw fiber and sugarcane bagasse.

=== Wood ===
In the United States from the 1940s to the 1960s, wooden salad bowls were recommended by many cookbooks. This fashion was started by the restaurateur and food writer George Rector, who in 1936 wrote a column entitled "Salad Daze". In that column, he recommended using an unvarnished wooden salad bowl, purportedly a French tradition. He recommended rubbing garlic into it for a hint of garlic flavor, oiling it regularly, and never washing it:

...age has everything to do with the bowl.... Wood, you see, is absorbent, and after you’ve been rubbing your bowl with garlic and anointing it with oil for some years, it will have acquired the patina of a Corinthian bronze and the personality of a 100-year-old brandy.
...Thirty years of sheer joy have oiled and polished and savored it until it is as distinguished an object as a 2,000-year-old Chinese shrine made of sandalwood.

— George Rector, "Salad Days"

By that Christmas season, wooden salad bowls had become a fashionable gift item, and by 1949, the cultural critic Russell Lynes was saying that a highbrow person "wouldn't dream of washing his salad bowl".

The wooden salad bowl was criticized soon thereafter, even if it had a finish:

The finish on cheap and badly made bowls will soon crack, the oil will seep into the crevices and eventually go rancid, and if garlic is rubbed frequently over the surface, the desirable faint undertone will soon become an objectionable odor that can only be described as a stench.

— Louis P. DeGouy (1945), "The Mixing of the Green"

Large wooden salad bowls, we are so often and authoritatively told, become seasoned with constant use, particularly if they are never washed. But it must be pointed out that the bowl, sooner or later, will develop imperceptible cracks, oil and food particles will inevitably collect in the cracks and become rancid.

— Michael Field (1965), Michael Field's Cooking School

== Use ==
Rubbing garlic on the salad bowl has a long history:

...frott[er] le saladier avec de l'ail qu'on écrase avec une croûte de pain nommée Chapon.
rub the salad bowl with garlic crushed with a crust of bread called a "capon"

— J. B. B. de Roquefort (1815), Histoire de la vie privée des françois

Even in the United States, this predates Rector: an American salad cookbook from 1926 recommends it in many recipes.
