= Black and Red =

Black and Red may refer to:

- "Black and Red", a song by Avail from their 2002 album Front Porch Stories
- "Black and Red", a song released in 2019 by Reignwolf
- Black and Red Press, a radical Marxist printers/publishers group that Fredy Perlman was involved with
- Black n' Red, the collection of notepads and journals now owned by the University of Oxford

== See also ==
- Black/Red, album by Feeder
- Red and black (disambiguation)
