= South Sudanese cuisine =

Culinary traditions of South Sudan

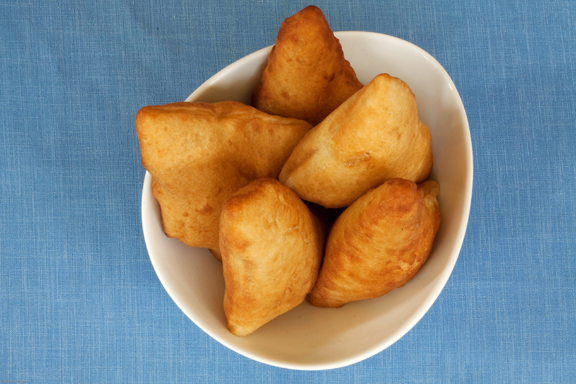
Mandazi

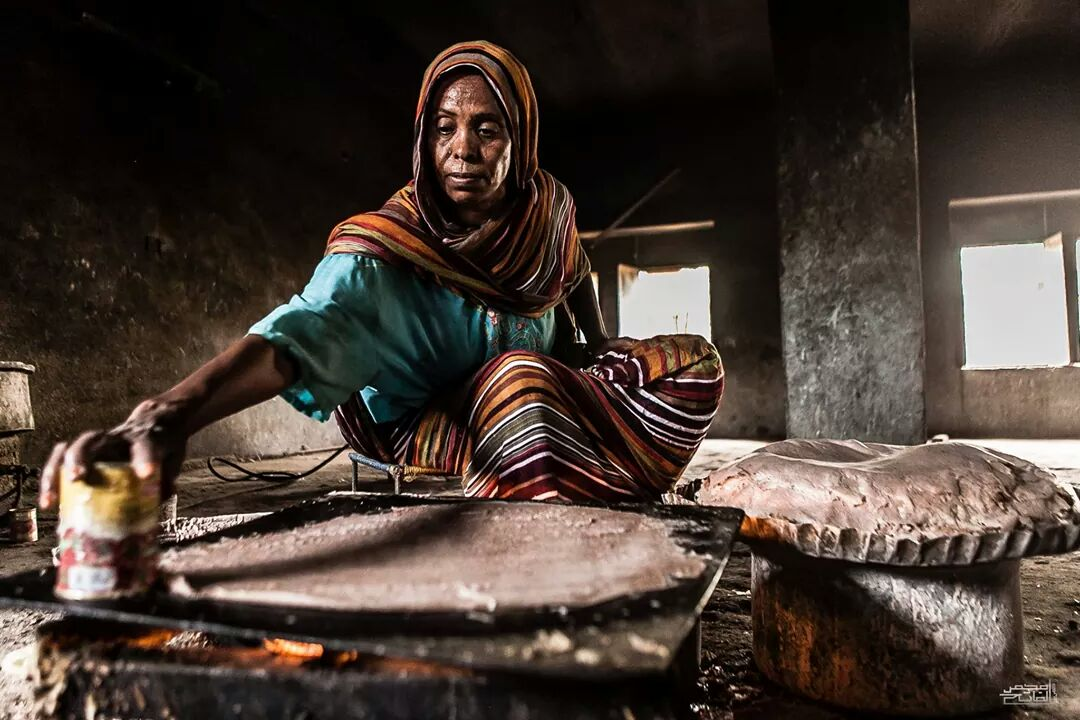
Preparation of kisra

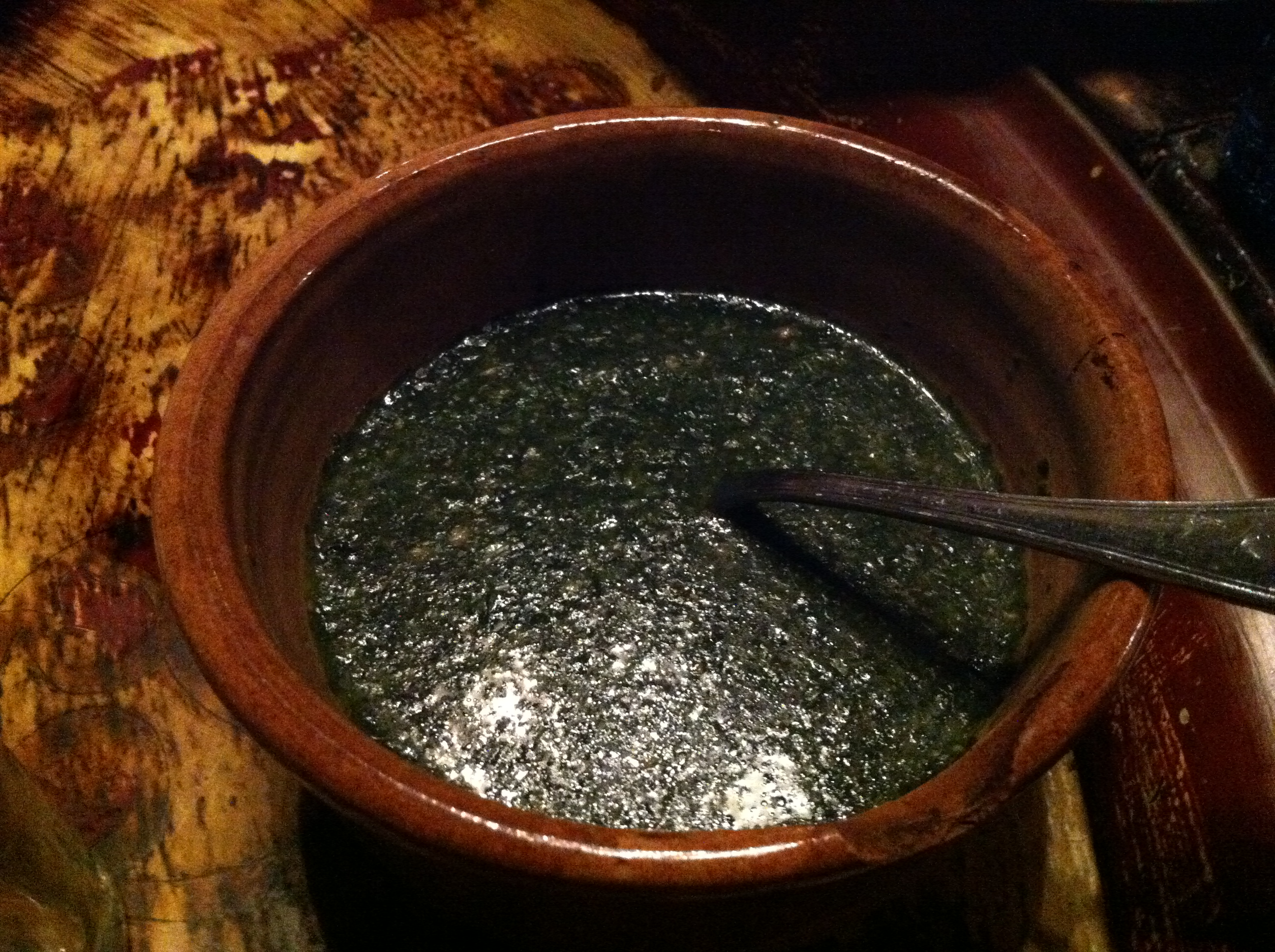
Molokhia

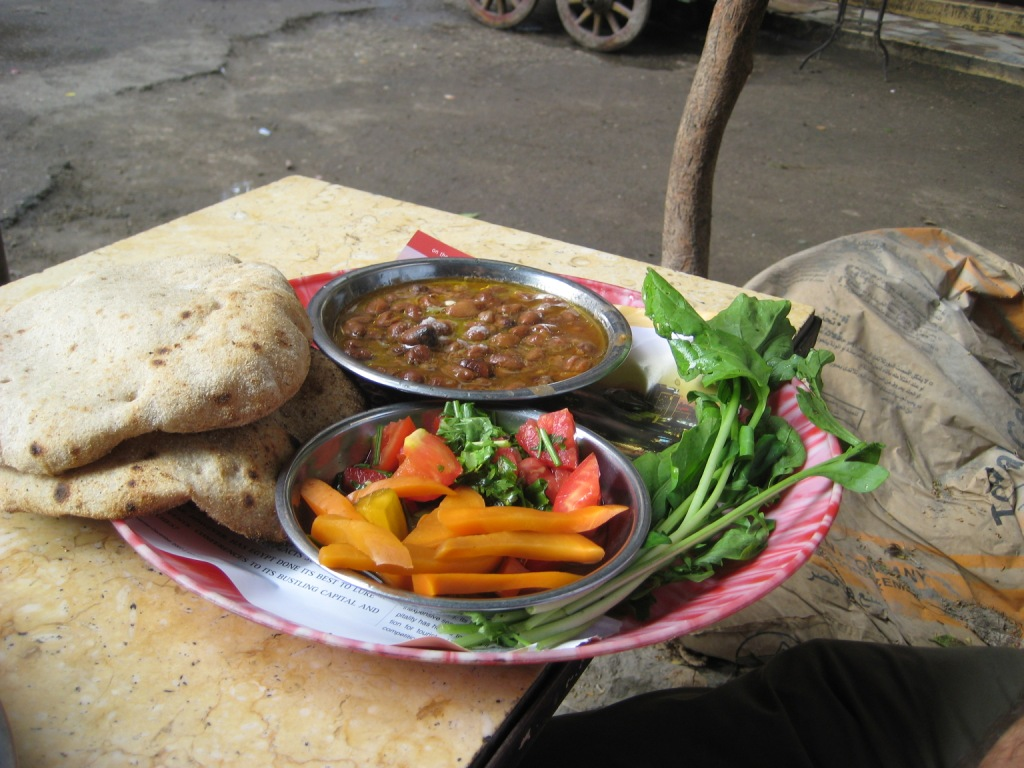
Ful medames

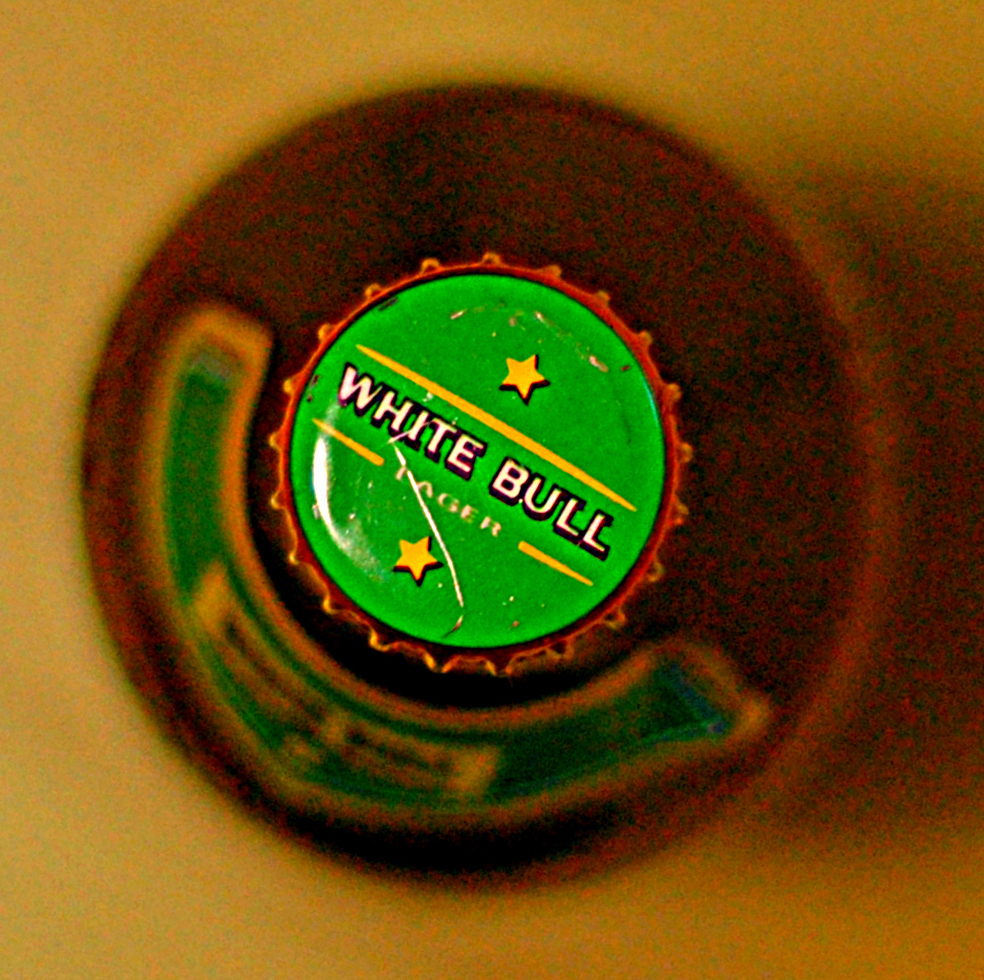
White Bull Lager

South Sudanese cuisine is based on grains (maize, sorghum). It uses yams, potatoes, vegetables, legumes (beans, lentil, peanuts), meat (goat, mutton, chicken and fish near the rivers and lakes), okra and fruit as well. Meat is boiled, grilled or dried.

South Sudanese cuisine was influenced by Arab cuisine.

== Examples of South Sudanese dishes ==
- Kisra, sorghum pancake, national dish
- Mandazi, fried pastry
- Wala-wala, millet porridge
- Aseeda, sorghum porridge
- Gurassa, yeasted pancake
- Kajaik, fish stew
- Ful sudani, peanut sweet
- Tamia, falafel
- Ful medames
- Combo, dish from spinach, peanut butter and tomatoes
- Goat meat soup
- Molokhia

== South Sudanese drinks ==
- Coffee
- Karkade
- Southern Sudan Beverages Limited, the only brewery in South Sudan, went bankrupt in 2016. It made three types of beer, like White Bull Lager.
