= Rouge et Noir (patience) =

Card game

Rouge et Noir (i.e. red and black) is a patience card game which is played using two decks of playing cards. It is a unique game where two types of building are done in the same game.

It should not be confused with the similarly named Red and Black, although the latter can also be known under this name, nor the gambling card game also called Trente et Quarante which is likewise known as Rouge et Noir.

Rouge et Noir is considered interesting in view of its large layout, and for enabling players to achieve easy but not automatic wins.

== Rules ==
In this game, there are ten columns. The first column contains eight cards, the second column contains seven cards, the third contains six and so on until the eighth and ninth columns each contain one card. The tenth column is left empty at the start of the game. All cards in each column except for the top card are faced down.

The object of the game is to release two red aces and two black aces (regardless of suit) to become foundations and to build each of them up, by color, to kings, while at the same time building four columns of cards in the tableau, each starting with a King and built down by alternating color.

All exposed cards are available for play to be placed either on the foundations or in the tableau. Building in the tableau is down by alternating color. Sequences can be moved in part or in whole, but empty columns can only be filled by a King, or a sequence that begins with a King.

When there are no more moves to be played, one card is placed onto each column from the stock; afterwards, play proceeds as normal. This cycle continues until the entire stock has run out.

When a sequence that starts with a King, ends with an Ace, and is built down in alternating colors is formed, it may be discarded at the player's discretion.

The game ends when the stock has run out. The game is won when 52 cards are built onto the four foundations while four King sequences are discarded.

== Strategy ==
In winning such a game, the player must decide which cards should be built, one at a time, into the four foundations, and which should be built into King-foundations, to be discarded later.

As a suggestion, the player should do whichever one does the most to help in cleaning up a column later. It also helps to take into account the fact that the player should not touch a completed column of thirteen cards.. It is also good to focus on releasing the face down cards on the leftmost columns to aid in splitting them and reaching the face-down cards, especially the first three columns.

== See also ==
- List of solitaire games
- Glossary of solitaire terms
