= Blumenthal (surname) =

Blumenthal is a surname of German origin, meaning: "flower valley" in German. It may be either an ornamental surname or derived from a place named Blumenthal. Spelling variant: Blumental. Notable people with the surname include:

- Albert H. Blumenthal (1928–1984), New York politician
- Alfred Cleveland Blumenthal (1885–1957), American theatrical producer and real estate developer
- Antje Blumenthal (born 1947), German politician
- Bartolomé Blumenthal (1511–1585), supposedly the first German to arrive in Chile
- Casimir von Blumenthal (1787–1849), Belgian violinist and conductor who worked in Switzerland
- Daniel Blumenthal (1860–1930), French politician
- Daniel Blumenthal (born 1952), German-born American pianist
- Florence Meyer Blumenthal (1875–1930), American philanthropist, underwrote the Prix Blumenthal
- Georg von Blumenthal (1490–1550), German Prince-Bishop and Bishop
- George Blumenthal (banker) (1858–1941), German-born banker
- George R. Blumenthal (born 1945), American astrophysicist, astronomer, professor, and academic administrator
- Gerda Blumenthal (1923–2004), German-American literary scholar
- Hans-Jürgen von Blumenthal (1907–1944), German aristocrat and army officer
- Herman A. Blumenthal (1916–1986), American art director and production designer for films
- Hermann Blumenthal (1905–1942), German sculptor and posthum participating in the documenta 1
- Heston Blumenthal (born 1966), British chef and owner of The Fat Duck restaurant
- Howard Blumenthal, American television and media producer, author, educator, and executive
- Ina Blumenthal (born 1981), German politician
- Jacques Blumenthal (1829–1908), German pianist and composer
- Joachim Friedrich von Blumenthal (1609–1657), German nobleman, diplomat, founder of the early Brandenburg-Prussian Army
- Joseph Blumenthal, main character in the novel The Hope by Herman Wouk
- Joseph Blumenthal (1897–1990), American printer and typographer
- Joseph von Blumenthal (1782–1856), Belgian violinist and composer
- Josip Mikoczy-Blumenthal (1734–1800), Croatian historian
- Karen Blumenthal (1959–2020), American business journalist and educator
- Leonard Blumenthal (1901–1986), American mathematician
- Leonhard Graf von Blumenthal (1810–1900), Prussian field marshal
- Morton J. Blumenthal (1931–2022), American lawyer and politician
- Mark Blumenthal (1831–1921), German-American physician
- Max Blumenthal (born 1977), American journalist
- Naomi Blumenthal (born 1943), former Israeli politician
- Naftali Blumenthal (1922–2022), former Israeli politician
- Nathan Blumenthal (1930–2014), birth name of Nathaniel Branden, Canadian psychotherapist and writer
- Oscar Blumenthal (1852–1917), German writer, critic, and chess player
- Otto Blumenthal (1876–1944), German mathematician
- Richard Blumenthal (born 1946), Democratic U. S. Senator from the state of Connecticut, elected 2010
- Robert Blumenthal (microbiologist), American microbiologist
- Robert McCallum Blumenthal (1931–2012), mathematician, known for Blumenthal's zero–one law
- Roy Blumenthal (born 1968), South African poet
- Sidney Blumenthal (born 1948), American journalist; advisor to Bill and Hillary Clinton
- Uta-Renate Blumenthal (1935–2025), German-born American medievalist and expert on canon law history
- Vera von Blumenthal (fl. 1918), contributed to the development of the Pueblo Indian pottery
- W. Michael Blumenthal (born 1926), U.S. business executive and Treasury Secretary
- Wolfgang Charles Werner von Blumenthal (1918–2009), birth name of Charles Arnold-Baker, English barrister, academic and historian

== See also ==
- von Blumenthal family
- Bloemendaal (disambiguation)
