= List of caricatures at Sardi's =

The following is an incomplete list of celebrities whose caricatures appear on the celebrity wall at Sardi's restaurant in New York City. All have eaten at Sardi's.

The date or year each caricature was added to Sardi's is often mentioned in brackets after the celebrities' name. Also mentioned is either the production the actor was in at the time of the unveiling or the play that included their definitive role; producers' companies are listed instead. Finally, some of the caricatures listed also include the cartoonist's name: Alex Gard, John Mackey, Donald Bevan, and Richard Baratz are the four artists to date who have created all the caricatures in the restaurant.

In 1979, Vincent Sardi, Jr., donated a collection of 227 caricatures from the restaurant to the Billy Rose Theatre Collection of the New York Public Library for the Performing Arts. The contributed caricatures date from the late 1920s through 1952.

== A ==
- George Abbott by Alex Gard
- George Abbott by Don Bevan
- F. Murray Abraham
- Yvonne Adair
- Cindy Adams
- Edie Adams
- Joey Adams
- Bruce Adler
- Stella Adler
- Danny Aiello by Richard Baratz
- Clay Aiken (Spamalot, December 23, 2008, Signed, "Finally I'm first at something!! Clay Aiken")
- Maria Alberghetti
- Eddie Albert by Richard Baratz
- Eddie Albert by John Mackey
- Alan Alda (Signed, "Hey, maybe now I'll get a table. Affectionately, Alan Alda")
- Jane Alexander
- Jason Alexander
- Richard Alexander
- Debbie Allen
- Jonelle Allen (Two Gentleman of Verona, 1972)
- Steve Allen by Don Bevan
- Michael Allinson
- Winthrop Ames by Alex Gard (Note: Housed in the Billy Rose Theatre Division of the New York Public Library for the Performing Arts.)
- Christine Andreas
  - Dame Judith Anderson by Alex Gard
- Dana Andrews by Don Bevan
- Edward Andrews
- Philip Anglim
- Susan Anton
- Yvonne Arnaud by Alex Gard
- Lucie Arnaz
- Bobbe Arnst by Alex Gard
- Bea Arthur
- Annaleigh Ashford (Kinky Boots, December 11, 2013)
- Elizabeth Ashley
- Brooks Ashmanskas
- Ed Asner (Grace, October 9, 2012)
- Fred Astaire
- Dame Eileen Atkins
- Brooks Atkinson
- Sir Richard Attenborough
- Edith Atwater by Alex Gard
- Hank Azaria (Spamalot, May 17, 2005)

== B ==
- Lauren Bacall
- Kevin Bacon by Richard Baratz
- Pearl Bailey by Don Bevan
- Dylan Baker
- Mark-Linn Baker
- Phil Baker by Alex Gard
- Kate Baldwin (Big Fish, December 20, 2013)
- Nikita Balieff by Alex Gard
- Lucille Ball
- Kaye Ballard by Don Bevan
- Anne Bancroft
- Antonio Banderas
- Tallulah Bankhead by Alex Gard
- Sara Bareilles
- Ellen Barkin
- Samantha Barks
- Clive Barnes by Richard Baratz
- Irina Baronova by Alex Gard
- Richard Barr
- Barbara Barrie
- Gene Barry by Richard Baratz
- Ethel Barrymore by Alex Gard
- Roger Bart
- Steve Barton
- Steven Baruch (producer Frankel-Baruch-Viertel-Routh Group, June 2004)
- Angela Bassett
- Bryan Batt (Saturday Night Fever, January 20, 2000)
- Hinton Battle
- Warner Baxter by Alex Gard
- Gary Beach
- Mayor Abe Beame
- Orson Bean
- Louise Beck
- Martin Beck
- Clyde Beatty by Alex Gard
- Barbara Bel Geddes
- Doris Belack
- Harry Belafonte
- Jim Belushi
- Laura Benanti (Gypsy, June 3, 2008)
- Robert Benchley by Alex Gard
- Constance Bennett by Alex Gard
- Joan Bennett
- Michael Bennett
- Melissa Benoist (Beautiful: The Carole King Musical, July 31, 2018)
- Jodi Benson by Richard Baratz
- Mimi Benzell
- Gertrude Berg
- Polly Bergen
- Ingrid Bergman by Don Bevan
- Milton Berle
- Irving Berlin
- Roger Berlind
- Herschel Bernardi
- Jed Bernstein
- Leonard Bernstein by Don Bevan
- Leonard Bernstein
- Craig Bierko (The Music Man, August 4, 2000)
- Jason Biggs
- James "Jack" Binger
- Patricia Birch
- Philip Birsh
- David Birney
- Reed Birney (The Humans, June 2, 2016)
- André Bishop
- Sidney Blackmer
- Steve Blanchard
- Cate Blanchett (The Present, March 14, 2017)
- Stephanie J. Block (The Pirate Queen, June 14, 2007)
- Claire Bloom by Don Bevan
- Kermit Bloomgarden
- Betty Blythe by Alex Gard
- William Boehnel by Alex Gard
- Humphrey Bogart
- Richard Boleslawski by Alex Gard
- Ray Bolger
- Bill Boll
- Joseph Bologna
- Fortunio Bonanova by Alex Gard
- Lillian Booth
- Shirley Booth
- Olive Borden by Alex Gard
- Victor Borge by Richard Baratz
- Christian Borle (Something Rotten, August 21, 2015)
- Tom Bosley
- Barry Bostwick
- Patricia Bowman by Alex Gard
- Bob Boyar
- Eddie Bracken
- Mark Bramble
- James Brennan
- Mary Brian
- Fanny Brice by Alex Gard
- Lloyd Bridges
- Alex Brightman (School of Rock, June 9, 2016)
- Jim Brochu
- Matthew Broderick by Richard Baratz
- Heywood Broun by Alex Gard
- Ashley Brown (Mary Poppins, August 31, 2007. Signed "I'm Practically Perfect in Everyway!")
- Blair Brown
- Dara Brown
- Georgia Brown
- Jason Robert Brown (The Bridges of Madison County, May 15, 2014)
- Joe E. Brown
- Vanessa Brown by Don Bevan
- Carol Bruce by Alex Gard
- Nigel Bruce by Alex Gard
- Yul Brynner
- Jack Buchanan
- Gene Buck by Alex Gard
- Betty Buckley
- Zev Buffman
- Leo Bulgakov by Alex Gard
- Laura Bell Bundy (Legally Blonde the Musical, April 24, 2008)
- Gregg Burge
- Gary Burghoff
- Carol Burnett by Don Bevan
- George Burns by Don Bevan
- Raymond Burr by Don Bevan
- Abe Burrows
- Danny Burstein
- Ellen Burstyn
- Mike Burstyn by Richard Baratz
- Kate Burton
- Richard Burton by Richard Baratz
- Kerry Butler (Xanadu, January 15, 2008)
- Red Buttons
- Norbert Leo Butz (Dirty Rotten Scoundrels, May 5, 2005)
- David Byrne

== C ==
- Sid Caesar
- Zoe Caldwell
- Louis Calhern
- Frank Cambria by Alex Gard
- Bobby Cannavale
- Eddie Cantor by Alex Gard
- Virginia Capers
- Al Capone by Alex Gard
- Al Capp by Don Bevan
- Dick Capri
- MacDonald Carey
- Len Cariou
- Kitty Carlisle
- Carolee Carmello
- Primo Carnera by Alex Gard
- Art Carney (The Odd Couple)
- Carleton Carpenter
- Constance Carpenter
- Sue Carol
- Alexander Carr by Alex Gard
- Allan Carr
- Keith Carradine
- Diahann Carroll
- Renee Carroll by Alex Gard
- Johnny Carson by Don Bevan
- Dixie Carter
- Sophia Anne Caruso (Beetlejuice: The Musical, July 10, 2019)
- Brent Carver
- Peggy Cass by Don Bevan
- David Cassidy
- Jack Cassidy
- Patrick Cassidy
- Shaun Cassidy
- Reg Cathey
- Steve Cauthen
- Dick Cavett by Don Bevan
- Cedric the Entertainer
- Bennett Cerf by Don Bevan
- Michael Cerveris
- Helene Chadwick
- Kathleen Chalfant
- Richard Chamberlain
- Kevin Chamberlin
- Helen Chandler by Alex Gard
- Carol Channing
- Stockard Channing
- Schuyler Chapin
- Cyd Charisse
- Martin Charnin
- Ilka Chase by Alex Gard
- Paddy Chayefsky
- Kristin Chenoweth (You're a Good Man, Charlie Brown, Epic Proportions, January 20, 2000)
- Irving Cheskin
- Maurice Chevalier by Don Bevan
- Michael Chiklis
- Bobby Clark
- Fred Clark
- Petula Clark
- Victoria Clark (August 29, 2005)
- Sharon D. Clarke
- Jill Clayburgh
- George Clooney (April 24, 2025)
- Glenn Close by Richard Baratz
- Harold Clurman
- Irvin S. Cobb by Alex Gard
- Lee J. Cobb
- Charles Coburn
- Imogene Coca (On the Twentieth Century, April 4, 1978) by Richard Baratz
- James Coco
- David Cogan
- Alexander H. Cohen
- Jack Cohn by Alex Gard
- Julius J. Colby by Alex Gard
- Cy Coleman
- Dame Joan Collins
- Bud Collyer
- Jodie Comer
- Jane Connell
- Kathy Connelly
- Harry Connick Jr.
- Kevin Conway
- Barbara Cook
- Carole Cook
- Bradley Cooper (The Elephant Man, May 6, 2015)
- Dulcie Cooper by Alex Gard
- Helmar Augustus Cooper
- Jackie Cooper
- Robert Coote
- Leanne Cope (An American in Paris, May 28, 2015)
- Joan Copeland
- Virginia Lee Corbin by Alex Gard
- Katharine Cornell by Alex Gard
- Ernest Cossart
- Pierre Cossette
- Staats Cotsworth
- Corey Cott
- Sir Noël Coward
- Daniel Craig
- Bryan Cranston (All the Way, May 29, 2014)
- Cheryl Crawford
- Joan Crawford
- Michael Crawford (as The Phantom of the Opera) by Richard Baratz
- Gavin Creel (Hair, September 30, 2009)
- Regina Crewe
- Darren Criss
- Anthony Crivello
- James Cromwell
- Walter Cronkite by Don Bevan
- Hume Cronyn
- Cathy Lee Crosby
- Sam Crothers
- Billy Crudup
- Billy Crystal (700 Sundays, June 9, 2005)
- Marton Csokas
- Robert Cuccioli (Jekyll & Hyde, October 28, 1997)
- Bill Cullen by Don Bevan
- John Cullum
- Alan Cumming (Cabaret, June 8, 2014)
- Mario Cuomo
- Tim Curry

== D ==
- Charlotte d'Amboise (Pippin, March 11, 2014)
- Morton DaCosta
- Dan Dailey
- Jim Dale
- Tyne Daly by Richard Baratz
- Jean Dalrymple
- Lili Damita by Alex Gard
- Graciela Daniele (director-choreographer Annie Get Your Gun, May 13, 1999)
- Jason Danieley (November 5, 2010)
- Jeff Daniels
- William Daniels
- Blythe Danner
- Tony Danza
- Howard Da Silva
- Roy D'Arcy by Alex Gard
- Damon Daunno
- Michael David (Dodger Productions, October 21, 1997)
- John Davidson
- Diana Davila
- Bette Davis
- Burton Davis by Alex Gard
- Clifton Davis
- Mac Davis
- Owen Davis by Alex Gard
- Sammy Davis Jr. by Don Bevan
- Alfred DeLiagre
- Dom DeLuise by Richard Baratz
- Jack Dempsey
- Robert De Niro by Richard Baratz
- Sandy Dennis
- Eugenio Derbez
- André De Shields
- Marlene Dietrich
- Emery Deutsch by Alex Gard
- Rene Devos by Alex Gard
- Colleen Dewhurst
- Mai Dietche
- Matt Dillon
- Tom Dillon
- Alan Dinehart by Alex Gard
- Mayor David Dinkins
- Bob Dishy
- Jean Dixon by Alex Gard
- Jack Donohue by Alex Gard
- King Donovan
- Diana Douglas
- Kirk Douglas by Don Bevan
- Michael Douglas
- Tommy Douglas by Alex Gard
- Eddie Dowling
- John Doyle (The Color Purple, May 24, 2016)
- Alfred Drake by John Mackey
- Fran Drescher (Cinderella, June 3, 2014)
- Louise DuArt
- Bide Dudley by Alex Gard
- Billy Duell
- David Dukes
- Tom Dulak
- Faye Dunaway
- Mary Duncan by Alex Gard
- Sandy Duncan
- Edwin Wallace Dunn by Alex Gard
- Charles Durning by Richard Baratz (The Best Man, December 22, 2000)
- Nancy Dussault

== E ==
- Pearl Eaton by Alex Gard
- Fred Ebb
- Christine Ebersole (42nd Street, May 9, 2003)
- Daysi Egan
- Susan Egan (Beauty and the Beast)
- Alan Eisenberg, Executive Director of Actors' Equity, 1981–2006
- Rick Elice
- Denholm Elliott (first caricature drawn by Don Bevan)
- Patricia Elliott
- Mary Ellis by Alex Gard
- Lillian Emerson by Alex Gard
- Lehman Engel
- Leih Erickson
- Leon Errol
- Cynthia Erivo (The Color Purple, June 12, 2016)
- Melissa Errico
- Chester Erskine by Alex Gard
- Cole Escola
- Raúl Esparza (Company, May 22, 2007)
- Dame Edith Evans
- Maurice Evans
- Judith Evelyn
- Rupert Everett
- Tom Ewell
- Marjorie Eyre by Alex Gard
- William Eythe

== F ==
- Mallory Factor
- Douglas Fairbanks by Alex Gard
- Douglas Fairbanks Jr. by Alex Gard
- Robert Fairchild (An American in Paris, May 28, 2015)
- Edie Falco
- Jimmy Fallon
- Jamie Farr
- Mia Farrow by Richard Baratz
- Rick Faugro
- Farrah Fawcett
- Frank Fay by Alex Gard
- Mary Fay
- Peggy Fears by Alex Gard
- Seymour Felix by Alex Gard
- Jesse Tyler Ferguson (Fully Committed, May 19, 2016)
- José Ferrer
- Betty Field by Alex Gard
- Sally Field
- Sylvia Field by Alex Gard
- Harvey Fierstein
- Albert Finney by Don Bevan
- Laurence Fishburne
- Geraldine Fitzgerald
- Martin Flavin by Alex Gard
- Robert Flemyng
- Nina Foch
- Henry Fonda
- Jane Fonda
- Santino Fontana
- Paul Ford
- John Forsythe by Don Bevan
- Bob Fosse by Richard Baratz
- Norman Foster by Alex Gard
- Sutton Foster by Richard Baratz
- Beth Fowler
- Sergio Franchi
- Arlene Francis by Don Bevan
- James Franco (Of Mice and Men, May 21, 2014)
- Richard Frankel (producer Frankel-Baruch-Viertel-Routh Group, June 2004)
- Samuel Freedman
- Jonathan Freeman (42nd Street, April 5, 2002)
- Kathleen Freeman
- Morgan Freeman
- Jim Freydberg
- Robert Fryer
- David Frost by Don Bevan
- Penny Fuller

== G ==
- Martin Gabel
- James Gandolfini
- Vincent Gardenia by Richard Baratz
- Reginald Gardiner by Alex Gard
- Andrew Garfield
- Robert Garland by Alex Gard
- Betty Garrett by Alex Gard
- David Garrison (Titanic, 1997)
- Lillian Gatlin by Alex Gard
- Bob Gaudio
- Janet Gaynor
- Arthur Gelb
- George Gershwin by Alex Gard
- Tamara Geva by Alex Gard
- Sir John Gielgud
- Kathie Lee Gifford
- Jack Gilford
- Hermione Gingold
- Jackie Gleason by Don Bevan
- Joanna Gleason (Dirty Rotten Scoundrels, May 5, 2005)
- Lucille Gleason by Alex Gard
- Robert Gleckler by Alex Gard
- Montego Glover (Memphis, March 10, 2011)
- Whoopi Goldberg by Richard Baratz (November 13, 1984)
- Annie Golden (The Full Monty, 2002)
- Edwin Franko Goldman by Alex Gard
- George Goldsmith by Alex Gard
- Cuba Gooding Jr. (The Trip to Bountiful, August 22, 2013)
- John Goodman
- Jack Gould by Don Bevan
- Robert Goulet by Richard Baratz
- Gilda Gray by Alex Gard
- Lauren Graham
- Jeanne Green by Alex Gard
- Johnny Green by Alex Gard
- Claude P. Greneker by Alex Gard
- Joel Grey by Don Bevan
- Harry Wagstaff Gribble by Alex Gard
- David Alan Grier (RACE, 2010)
- Merv Griffin by Don Bevan
- D.W. Griffith by Alex Gard
- Rachel Griffiths
- Josh Groban
- Jonathan Groff
- Milt Gross by Alex Gard
- George Grossmith, Jr. by Alex Gard
- Texas Guinan by Alex Gard
- Sir Alec Guinness
- Arthur Guiterman by Alex Gard
- Gerald Gutierrez (director, April 16, 1998)
- Edmund Gwenn
- Fred Gwynne by Richard Baratz

== H ==
- Dorothy Hall by Alex Gard
- Mordaunt Hall (film critic for The New York Times) by Alex Gard
- Mark Hamill
- George Hamilton by Richard Baratz
- Margaret Hamilton
- Marvin Hamlisch by Richard Baratz (December 29, 1976)
- Oscar Hammerstein II
- Tom Hanks (Lucky Guy, May 23, 2013)
- Otto Harbach by Alex Gard
- Dorian Harewood
- Kenneth Harlan by Alex Gard
- Sheldon Harnick
- Valerie Harper
- William Harrigan by Alex Gard
- Jed Harris by Alex Gard
- Julie Harris by Don Bevan
- Neil Patrick Harris (Hedwig and the Angry Inch, August 15, 2014)
- Phil Harris by Alex Gard
- Richard Harris by Richard Baratz
- Sam H. Harris by Alex Gard
- Sir Rex Harrison
- Kitty Carlisle Hart by Don Bevan
- Lorenz Hart by Alex Gard
- Vivian Hart by Alex Gard
- Paul Hartman by Alex Gard
- William Hawkins by Don Bevan
- Helen Hayes by Alex Gard
- Heather Headley
- Betty Healy by Alex Gard
- Ted Healy (1927, subject of the first Sardi's caricature) by Alex Gard
- Van Heflin by Don Bevan
- Mark Hellinger by Alex Gard
- Florence Henderson
- Shuler Hensley (Oklahoma!, July 9, 2002)
- Katharine Hepburn by Alex Gard
- Evelyn Herbert by Alex Gard
- F. Hugh Herbert by Don Bevan
- Ed Herlihy
- Jerry Herman
- Harry Hershfield by Alex Gard
- Charlton Heston
- John Benjamin Hickey
- Tom Hiddleston (Betrayal, 2019)
- Arthur Hill
- Dame Wendy Hiller by Alex Gard
- Gregory Hines by Richard Baratz
- Maurice Hines
- Paul Hipp
- Al Hirschfeld
- Dustin Hoffman by Richard Baratz
- Gertrude W. Hoffman by Alex Gard
- Llora Hoffman by Alex Gard
- Hal Holbrook by Don Bevan
- William Holden
- Stanley Holloway
- Celeste Holm
- Bob Hope
- Sir Anthony Hopkins
- Miriam Hopkins by Alex Gard
- Lena Horne
- Jayne Houdyshell (The Humans, June 2, 2016)
- John Houseman by Richard Baratz
- Leslie Howard by Alex Gard
- Terrence Howard
- Julia Hoyt by Alex Gard
- Josephine Hull by Alex Gard
- Cecil Humphreys by Alex Gard
- Fannie Hurst by Alex Gard
- Muriel Hutchison by Alex Gard
- Wilfred Hyde-White by Don Bevan
- Jeff Hyslop
- Sir Nicholas Hytner

== I ==
- Amy Irving
- George S. Irving
- Dana Ivey
- Judith Ivey
- Bill Irwin
- Burl Ives

== J ==
- Hugh Jackman
- Cheyenne Jackson (Xanadu, January 15, 2008)
- Christopher Jackson (Hamilton, November 11, 2016)
- Samuel L. Jackson
- Lou Jacobi
- Arielle Jacobs
- Bernard Jacobs by Richard Baratz
- Brian d'Arcy James
- Leon Janney by Alex Gard
- Gregory Jbara (Dirty Rotten Scoundrels, May 5, 2005)
- Martin Jensen by Alex Gard
- George Jessel by Alex Gard
- Billy Joel by Richard Baratz
- Glynis Johns
- Edward Johnson by Alex Gard
- Van Johnson
- Al Jolson by Alex Gard
- James Earl Jones by Don Bevan
- Rachel Bay Jones (Pippin, March 11, 2014)
- Ray Jones by Alex Gard
- Rebecca Naomi Jones
- Shirley Jones (42nd Street, July 2004)
- Jeremy Jordan
- Raul Julia

== K ==
- John Kander
- Helen Kane by Alex Gard
- Andy Karl (Groundhog Day, June 1, 2017)
- Sonia Karlov by Alex Gard
- George S. Kaufman by Alex Gard
- Judy Kaye
- Stacy Keach
- Ian Keith by Alex Gard
- Colin Keith-Johnston by Alex Gard
- Helen Keller by Alex Gard
- Gene Kelly
- Grace Kelly by Don Bevan
- Nell Kelly by Alex Gard
- Pert Kelton by Don Bevan (Signed, "Only someone who's been around as long as I have can appreciate this")
- Nick Kenny by Alex Gard
- Kermit the Frog (leftover prop from The Muppets Take Manhattan, located near restrooms) by anonymous
- Jerome Kern
- Walter Kerr by Don Bevan
- Richard Kiley
- Dorothy Kilgallen by Alex Gard
- Chad Kimball (Memphis, March 10, 2011)
- John Reed King
- Walter J. Kingsley by Alex Gard
- Muriel Kirkland by Alex Gard
- Eartha Kitt by Don Bevan
- Robert Klein by Richard Baratz
- Werner Klemperer by Richard Baratz
- Jack Klugman by Richard Baratz
- Mayor Ed Koch by Richard Baratz
- Ernie Kovacs by Don Bevan
- Jane Krakowski (She Loves Me, May 31, 2016)
- Judy Kuhn (Fun Home, June 2, 2015)
- Frederic Arnold Kummer by Alex Gard
- Swoosie Kurtz by Richard Baratz

== L ==
- Cheryl Ladd (Annie Get Your Gun, January 10, 2001)
- Bert Lahr by Alex Gard
- Harriette Lake (a.k.a. Ann Sothern) by Alex Gard
- Rocco Landesman
- Nathan Lane
- Fritz Lang
- Dame Angela Lansbury by Don Bevan
- Laura La Plante by Alex Gard
- Ring Lardner by Alex Gard
- Dick Latessa (Hairspray, around May 23, 2003)
- Cyndi Lauper (June 5, 2013)
- Dan Lauria
- Linda Lavin
- Gertrude Lawrence by Alex Gard
- Lawrence Shubert Lawrence by Don Bevan
- Thomas F. Leahy
- Guy LeBow
- Beth Leavel
- Gavin Lee (Mary Poppins, August 31, 2007)
- Michele Lee (December 14, 2006)
- Edna Leedom by Alex Gard
- Alexander Leftwich by Alex Gard
- John Leguizamo
- Margaret Leighton
- Charles LeMaire by Alex Gard
- Jack Lemmon by Don Bevan
- Lotte Lenya
- Mervyn LeRoy by Alex Gard
- Caissie Levy
- Telly Leung
- Huey Lewis
- Jerry Lewis
- Michael Shawn Lewis (The Phantom of the Opera, September 25, 2002)
- Norm Lewis (The Gershwins' Porgy and Bess, June 1, 2012)
- Max Lief by Alex Gard
- Beatrice Lillie
- Judith Light
- Hal Linden by Donald Bevan
- Hal Linden by Richard Baratz
- Mayor John Lindsay
- Laura Linney
- Joe Lisi
- John Lithgow
- Lucy Liu
- Tony LoBianco
- June Lockhart
- Joshua Logan
- Anita Loos by Alex Gard
- Priscilla Lopez
- Robert Loraine by Alex Gard
- Peter Lorre by Alex Gard
- Bessie Love by Alex Gard
- Myrna Loy by Richard Baratz
- Ernst Lubitsch by Alex Gard
- Josh Lucas
- Susan Lucci (Annie Get Your Gun, April 8, 2000)
- Patti LuPone
- Wanda Lyon by Alex Gard
- Bert Lytell by Alex Gard

== M ==
- Lebo M
- Joseph Macaulay by Alex Gard
- Jeanette MacDonald by Alex Gard
- Bruce MacFarlane by Alex Gard
- Dorothy Mackaill by Alex Gard
- Kenneth MacKenna by Alex Gard
- Sir Cameron Mackintosh
- Shirley MacLaine by Don Bevan
- Will Mahoney by Alex Gard
- Karl Malden by Don Bevan
- John Malkovich by Richard Baratz
- Louis Mann by Alex Gard
- Terrence Mann
- Barry Manilow (February 14, 2013)
- Joe Mantello
- Arthur Margetson by John Mackey
- Constantine Maroulis (Rock of Ages, March 18, 2010)
- Bianca Marroquin
- Marian Marsh by Alex Gard
- Everett Marshall by Alex Gard
- Rob Marshall
- Andrea Martin (Pippin, August 29, 2013)
- Bob Martin (The Drowsy Chaperone, December 27, 2006)
- The Marx Brothers by Alex Gard
- Jackie Mason
- Marsha Mason
- Raymond Massey
- Marlee Matlin (Spring Awakening, November 24, 2015)
- Walter Matthau by Don Bevan
- Michael Mayer
- Jefferson Mays (A Gentleman's Guide to Love and Murder, October 29, 2014)
- Marin Mazzie (Kiss Me, Kate, May 4, 2000)
- Andrea McArdle (Beauty and the Beast, January 26, 2000)
- Jack McCauley by Alex Gard
- John McClain by Don Bevan
- Rue McClanahan
- Guthrie McClintic
- Rob McClure (Chaplin, November 14, 2012)
- Mildred McCoy by Alex Gard
- Audra McDonald (Ragtime, December 17, 1998)
- Frances McDormand
- Reba McEntire
- Maureen McGovern
- Michael McGrath
- Jimmy McHugh by Alex Gard
- Sir Ian McKellen by Richard Baratz
- Harry McNaughton by Alex Gard
- Janet McTeer
- Lynne Meadow (October 24, 2012)
- Audrey Meadows by Don Bevan
- Jayne Meadows by Don Bevan
- Anne Meara by Richard Baratz
- John Henry Mears by Alex Gard
- Leighton Meester (Of Mice and Men, May 21, 2014)
- Lindsay Mendez
- Alan Menken by Richard Baratz
- Idina Menzel
- Burgess Meredith
- Philip Merivale by Alex Gard
- Ethel Merman by Alex Gard
- David Merrick
- Lea Michele
- Bette Midler
- Ann Miller (Sugar Babies, 1979)
- Arthur Miller
- Ernst Miller by Alex Gard
- Marilyn Miller by Alex Gard
- Mitch Miller by Don Bevan
- Patina Miller (Pippin, March 11, 2014)
- Patsy Ruth Miller by Alex Gard
- Sienna Miller (Cabaret, March 27, 2015)
- Sir John Mills
- Liza Minnelli by Richard Baratz
- Lin-Manuel Miranda (Hamilton, May 24, 2016)
- Dame Helen Mirren (The Audience, May 12, 2015)
- Jerry Mitchell (Kinky Boots, December 11, 2013)
- Thomas Mitchell by Alex Gard
- Alfred Molina (Fiddler on the Roof, August 4, 2004)
- Ricardo Montalbán by Don Bevan
- Mary Tyler Moore by Richard Baratz
- Michael Moore
- Victor Moore by Alex Gard
- Ward Morehouse by Alex Gard
- Claudia Morgan by Alex Gard
- Frank Morgan by Alex Gard
- Helen Morgan by Alex Gard
- Robert Morley
- Dave E. Morris by Alex Gard
- Robert Morse by Don Bevan
- Charles B. Moskowitz by Alex Gard
- Elisabeth Moss (The Heidi Chronicles, May 28, 2015)
- Zero Mostel by Don Bevan
- Alan Mowbray by Alex Gard
- Jessie Mueller (Beautiful: The Carole King Musical, January 23, 2015)
- Paul Muni by Alex Gard
- Ona Munson by Alex Gard
- Arthur Murray by Don Bevan
- Kathryn Murray by Don Bevan

== N ==
- Mark Nadler
- Rick Najera
- Kathy Najimy by Richard Baratz
- N. Nakarovo
- Joe Namath
- Mildred Natwick by Richard Baratz
- James Naughton
- Patricia Neal
- James M. Nederlander
- Robert Nederlander
- Ruth Negga
- Gene Nelson
- Bebe Neuwirth
- Paul Newman by Don Bevan
- Phyllis Newman
- Kristine Nielsen (Vanya and Sonia and Masha and Spike, August 21, 2013)
- Greta Nissen by Alex Gard
- Cynthia Nixon
- Lloyd Nolan
- Alan North
- Jim Norton (Of Mice and Men, May 21, 2014)
- Chris Noth by Richard Baratz (The Best Man, December 22, 2000)
- Michael Nouri
- Nelle Nugent
- Lupita Nyong'o (Eclipsed, May 19, 2016)

== O ==
- Jack Oakie
- Pat O'Brien
- Carroll O'Connor by Richard Baratz
- Nell O'Day by Alex Gard
- Leslie Odom Jr.
- Rosie O'Donnell (November 11, 2008)
- Chris O'Dowd (Of Mice and Men, May 21, 2014)
- Kelli O'Hara (Nice Work If You Can Get It, June 5, 2012)
- Eugene O'Neill by Alex Gard
- Maureen O'Sullivan
- The Lord Olivier by Don Bevan
- Jerry Orbach
- Orfeh
- Sono Osato by Alex Gard
- E. W. Osborn by Alex Gard
- Brad Oscar (The Producers, March 13, 2002)
- Haley Joel Osment
- Donny Osmond (Beauty and the Beast, October 27, 2006)
- Marie Osmond (October 27, 2006)
- Laura Osnes (Bandstand, May 12, 2017)
- Catherine Dale Owen by Alex Gard

== P ==
- Jack Paar by Don Bevan
- Al Pacino by Richard Baratz
- Patrick Page
- Chazz Palminteri
- Joseph Papp by Richard Baratz
- Dorothy Parker
- Jim Parsons
- Mandy Patinkin
- Ed Paul by Alex Gard
- Sarah Paulson
- J. Lennox Pawle by Alex Gard
- Brock Pemberton by Alex Gard
- Virginia Pemberton by Alex Gard
- Rosie Perez
- Anthony Perkins by Don Bevan
- Bobbie Perkins by Alex Gard
- Bernadette Peters
- Boris Petroff by Alex Gard
- Regis Philbin by Richard Baratz
- Lou Diamond Phillips
- Margaret Phillips by Alex Gard
- Sally Phipps by Alex Gard
- Molly Picon by Alex Gard
- David Hyde Pierce (Spamalot, May 17, 2005)
- Wendell Pierce
- Bryce Pinkham (A Gentleman's Guide to Love and Murder, October 29, 2014)
- Luigi Pirandello by Alex Gard
- Louise Pitre (Mamma Mia!, February 2002) Pitre has a drink in hand
- Ben Platt
- Oliver Platt
- Donald Pleasence
- Dame Joan Plowright by Don Bevan
- Christopher Plummer by Don Bevan
- Sidney Poitier by Don Bevan
- Arthur Pollock by Alex Gard
- Lily Pons by Alex Gard
- Billy Porter (Kinky Boots, December 11, 2013)
- Tom Poston
- Jane Powell
- Robert Preston by Don Bevan
- Georgie Price by Alex Gard
- Vincent Price
- Sir Jonathan Pryce by Richard Baratz
- Gertrude Purcell by Alex Gard

== Q ==
- Sir Anthony Quayle
- Anthony Quinn by Don Bevan

== R ==
- Daniel Radcliffe (Equus, January 29, 2009)
- Charlotte Rae by Richard Baratz
- Rafiki (The Lion King)
- Natacha Rambova by Alex Gard
- Sara Ramirez
- Tony Randall by Don Bevan
- Joyce Randolph by Richard Baratz
- Gayle Rankin
- Phylicia Rashad
- Herbert Rawlinson by Alex Gard
- Charles Ray by Alex Gard
- Janet Reade by Alex Gard
- Lynn Redgrave
- Sir Michael Redgrave
- Eddie Redmayne
- Christopher Reeve
- Carl Reiner
- Ann Reinking (Chicago and Fosse, March 20, 1999)
- Charles Nelson Reilly by Richard Baratz
- Lee Remick by Don Bevan
- William Ricciardi by Alex Gard
- Tim Rice
- LaTanya Richardson
- Cathy Rigby (Peter Pan, August 26, 1999)
- Alice Ripley (Next to Normal, September 24, 2009)
- Cyril Ritchard
- John Ritter
- Chita Rivera by Don Bevan
- Joan Rivers by Richard Baratz
- Jason Robards by Don Bevan
- Jerome Robbins
- Chris Rock
- Richard Rodgers
- Elizabeth Rodriguez
- Ginger Rogers
- Ruth Roland by Alex Gard
- Anika Noni Rose
- Rose Marie (October 3, 2017, Signed "I'm very honored!! Thank you so much. Lots of love, Rose Marie.")
- A. M. Rosenthal by Richard Baratz
- Harry Rosenthal by Alex Gard
- Lillian Roth by Alex Gard
- Marc Routh (producer Frankel-Baruch-Viertel-Routh Group, June 2004)
- Richard Roxburgh ("The Present" March 14, 2017)
- Elvina Rowe by Alex Gard
- Arthur Rubin (actor & singer; later Vice President/General Manager of the Nederlander Organization)
- John Rubinstein (Pippin, July 31, 2014)
- Paul Rudd (Grace, October 9, 2012)
- Rosalind Russell
- Robert Ryan by Don Bevan
- Louis Rydell by Alex Gard

== S ==
- Donald Saddler (May 25, 2007)
- Bob Saget
- Lea Salonga
- Diana Sands
- Stark Sands (Kinky Boots, December 11, 2013)
- Cristina Saralegui
- Marie Saxon by Alex Gard
- Tito Schipa by Alex Gard
- John Schneider
- Gerald Schoenfeld by Richard Baratz
- Louis Schonceit by Alex Gard
- Annabella Sciorra
- Thomas Schumacher (Mary Poppins producer. Signed "Holly Cow, Who the hell is that?!? ~". He meant to write "Holy Cow~".)
- Paul Scofield
- George C. Scott by Richard Baratz
- Sherie Rene Scott (Dirty Rotten Scoundrels, May 5, 2005)
- Oscar Serlin by Alex Gard
- Jane Seymour (Amadeus, April 23, 1981)
- Michael Shannon (Grace, October 9, 2012)
- William Shatner
- Julia Shawell by Alex Gard
- Michael Sheen (Frost/Nixon, August 10, 2007)
- Tony Sheldon
- Carole Shelley
- Brooke Shields
- Samuel Shipman by Alex Gard
- Martin Short
- Lee Shubert
- Sylvia Sidney
- Christopher Sieber (Matilda the Musical, November 13, 2014)
- Beverly Sills
- Douglas Sills (The Scarlet Pimpernel, June 4, 1998)
- Phil Silvers
- Neil Simon (Don Bevan)
- Hugh Sinclair by Alex Gard
- Gary Sinise
- Menasha Skulnik
- Christian Slater
- John Slattery
- Liz Smith by Richard Baratz
- Dame Maggie Smith
- Rex Smith (The Scarlet Pimpernel, January 20, 1999)
- Stanley Smith by Alex Gard
- Louis Sobol
- Suzanne Somers
- Stephen Sondheim
- Phillipa Soo (February 28, 2018)
- Paul Sorvino by Richard Baratz
- James Spader (RACE, 2010)
- John Stamos
- Dave Stamper by Alex Gard
- Kim Stanley
- Barbara Stanwyck
- Jean Stapleton
- Maureen Stapleton by Don Bevan
- John Steinbeck
- Sir Patrick Stewart
- Dorothy Stickney
- Jerry Stiller by Richard Baratz
- Sting (The Last Ship, January 20, 2015)
- Lee Strasberg
- Barbra Streisand (June 13, 2016)
- Elaine Stritch
- Ed Strong (Dodger Productions, October 21, 1997)
- Charles Strouse
- Sally Struthers
- Susan Stroman
- Barry Sullivan
- Ed Sullivan by Don Bevan
- Gloria Swanson
- Will Swenson
- Kay Swift (1987, to honor her 90th birthday)
- Loretta Swit
- Paolo Szot

== T ==
- Desiree Tabor by Alex Gard
- Jessica Tandy
- Billy Taylor
- Elizabeth Taylor by Richard Baratz
- Estelle Taylor by Alex Gard
- Laurette Taylor
- Renée Taylor
- Ruth Taylor by Alex Gard
- Mary Testa (42nd Street, March 1, 2002)
- Danny Thomas
- Marlo Thomas
- Matthew James Thomas (Pippin, March 11, 2014)
- Richard Thomas
- Jennifer Laura Thompson
- Uma Thurman
- Howard Thurston by Alex Gard
- Gene Tierney
- Bill Todman
- Lily Tomlin by Richard Baratz
- Topol
- Toto the Clown by Alex Gard
- Tamara Toumanova by Alex Gard
- Constance Tours
- John Travolta
- Lady Viola Tree
- Paula Trueman by Alex Gard
- Ernest Truex by Alex Gard
- Stanley Tucci
- Sophie Tucker
- Tommy Tune
- Aaron Tveit (Moulin Rouge! The Musical), March 31, 2022)
- Twiggy (a.k.a. Dame Lesley Lawson)
- Margaret Tyzack

== U ==
- Leslie Uggams
- Leslie Uggams
- Alfred Uhry
- Nick Ullett
- Liv Ullmann
- Tracey Ullman
- Harriette Underhill by Alex Gard
- Blair Underwood
- Michael Urie
- Sir Peter Ustinov

== V ==
- Brenda Vaccaro
- Rudy Vallée by Alex Gard
- Bobby Van
- Joop van den Ende (producer, November 26, 2000) by Richard Baratz
- Tom Van Dycke by Alex Gard
- Dick Van Dyke by Don Bevan
- Jo Van Fleet
- Courtney B. Vance (Lucky Guy, July 3, 2013)
- Yul Vazquez
- Benay Venuta
- Gwen Verdon by Don Bevan
- Gerry Vichi
- Gore Vidal (writer The Best Man, September 29, 2000)
- Bayard Veiller by Alex Gard
- Ben Vereen by Don Bevan
- Tom Viertel (producer Frankel-Baruch-Viertel-Routh Group, June 2004)
- Ana Villafane
- Jon Voight

== W ==
- Mayor Robert Wagner
- Christopher Walken
- Jessica Walker
- Mayor Jimmy Walker by Alex Gard
- Nancy Walker
- Polly Walker by Alex Gard
- David Wallace
- Mike Wallace by Don Bevan
- Eli Wallach
- Ray Walston
- Tony Walton
- Robert Wankel
- Fred Waring by Alex Gard
- Sherman Warner (Dodger Productions, October 21, 1997)
- Adrienne Warren
- Ruth Warrick
- Kerry Washington (RACE, 2010)
- Sam Waterston
- Linda Watkins by Alex Gard
- Douglas Watt
- Richard Watts Jr. by Alex Gard
- David Wayne
- Paula Wayne by Don Bevan
- Fritz Weaver
- Robert Webber
- Steven Weber
- Robert Weede
- Irving Welzer (producer Annie Get Your Gun, August 4, 1999)
- Rita Weiman by Alex Gard
- Raquel Welch
- Dr. Ruth Westheimer
- Jack Weston by Richard Baratz
- George White
- Lillias White
- Robert Whitehead
- Mary Wickes
- Crane Wilbur by Alex Gard
- Frank Wildhorn (composer The Scarlet Pimpernel, June 4, 1999)
- Lee Wilkof
- Elizabeth Williams
- Herb Williams (c. 1884–1936) by Alex Gard
- John Williams
- Michelle Williams
- Treat Williams
- Vanessa Williams
- Bruce Willis
- Earl Wilson
- Elizabeth Wilson
- John C. Wilson
- Meredith Willson
- Rita Wilson
- Paul Winchell by Don Bevan
- Walter Winchell
- Claire Windsor
- Henry Winkler (The Dinner Party, November 30, 2000)
- Roland Winters
- Shelley Winters by Don Bevan
- Estelle Winwood
- Iggie Wolfington
- John Wood
- Joanne Woodward
- Walter Woolf by Alex Gard
- Alexander Woollcott by Alex Gard
- Tom Wopat (Annie Get Your Gun, June 30, 1999)
- JoAnne Worley
- Teresa Wright
- Gretchen Wyler
- Ed Wynn
- Keenan Wynn

== Y ==
- Lewis Yancey by Alex Gard
- Tony Yazbeck (On The Town, August 4, 2015)
- Maury Yeston
- Michael York
- Rachel York
- Gig Young
- John Lloyd Young (Jersey Boys, February 23, 2006)
- Tammany Young by Alex Gard
- Blanche Yurka by Alex Gard

== Z ==
- Pia Zadora
- Billy Zane
- Florenz Ziegfeld
- Karen Ziemba
- Chip Zien
- Katharine Zimmermann
- Fred Zollo

== Double portraits ==
- Marge and Gower Champion by Don Bevan
- Betty Comden and Adolph Green by Don Bevan
- Dame Edna and Barry Humphries (Dame Edna: The Royal Tour, February 20, 2000)
- Earle Larrimore and Selena Royle by Alex Gard
- Alan Jay Lerner and Frederick Loewe by Don Bevan
- Colette Brosset and Robert Dhery
- Howard Lindsay and Russel Crouse by Alex Gard
- Alfred Lunt and Lynn Fontanne by Alex Gard
- Willie and Eugene Howard by Alex Gard
- Fredric March and Florence Eldridge by Don Bevan
- Ken Waissman and Maxine Fox
- Cy Feuer and Ernst Martin
- Peter and Mary Lind Hayes
- Edgar Lansbury and Joseph Beruh
- Juliet and Lester Lewis
- Barry and Fran Weissler
- Mike Nichols and Elaine May by Don Bevan
- Penn & Teller (Penn & Teller On Broadway, July 1, 2015)
- Harold Prince and Bobby Griffith by Don Bevan
- Richard Rodgers and Oscar Hammerstein II by Alex Gard
- Jerome Lawrence and Robert E. Lee
- Paul Winchell with ventriloquist figure Jerry Mahoney by Don Bevan

== Quadruple portraits ==
- Dudley Moore, Jonathan Miller, Alan Bennett, and Peter Cook of Beyond the Fringe by Don Bevan
- Oona Lawrence, Bailey Ryon, Sophia Gennusa, and Milly Shapiro, all playing "Matilda" in Matilda the Musical

== See also ==
- List of caricaturists
