= Blumental =

Blumental is an artificial surname, a variant of Blumenthal: Blumen + Tal. Notable people with the surname include

- Felicja Blumental (1908–1991), a Polish pianist and composer.
- Nachman Blumental (1902–1983), Polish and Israeli historian

== See also ==
- Blumenthal (disambiguation)
- Bloemendaal (disambiguation)
- Blumental, former German name for the village of Piętki, Poland
