= Blumenthal =

Blumenthal is a German name meaning "flower dale". The English name Bloomingdale is composed of the same Germanic roots. A spelling reform in 1901 omitted the letter h in the word Thal in normal use, i.e., the equivalent word is "Blumental". It may refer to:

- Blumenthal (surname)

== Places ==
=== Canada ===
- Blumenthal, Saskatchewan, a Mennonite village that is now an organized hamlet in central Saskatchewan
- Blumenthal, a Mennonite village in the "West Reserve" in Manitoba

=== Germany ===
- Blumenthal, Schleswig-Holstein, a municipality in Rendsburg-Eckernförde district of Schleswig-Holstein
- Blumenthal, a village in Hellenthal in North Rhine-Westphalia

=== Mexico ===
- Blumenthal, two Mennonite villages near Ciudad Cuauhtémoc, Chihuahua,
- Blumenthal, a Mennonite village (Campo 17) in the Durango Colony

=== Paraguay ===
- Blumenthal, a Mennonite village in Menno Colony
- Blumenthal, a Mennonite village in Fernheim Colony

=== Other countries ===
- Blumenthal, the German name for Kwiatkowice, Gorzów County, Lubusz Voivodeship, Poland
- Blumenthal, Luxembourg, a town in Junglinster, Luxembourg
- Blumenthal, the German name for Mașloc commune in Timiș County, Romania
- Blumenthal, Texas, a settlement in Gillespie County, Texas, United States
- Blumenthal, two former Mennonite villages in the Shlachtin and Memrik Colonies, Ukraine

== Other ==
- Blumenthal Award from the American Mathematical Society
- Blumenthal Rare Book and Manuscript Library of the Judah L. Magnes Museum, Berkeley, California, United States
- Blumenthal Brothers Chocolate Company
- North Carolina Blumenthal Performing Arts Center, Charlotte, NC, United States
- 21414 Blumenthal, a Main-belt Asteroid
- Blumenthal Field, North Carolina WW2 airfield
- Blumenthal Observation Tower
- Prix Blumenthal (1919–1954)
- Daniel von dem blühenden Tal (Daniel of the Flowering Valley), an Arthurian romance composed around 1220
- Zion Blumenthal Orphanage

== See also ==
- Bloemendaal (disambiguation)
