= Child of Manhattan =

Child of Manhattan may refer to:

- Child of Manhattan (play), a 1932 play by Preston Sturges
- Child of Manhattan (film), a 1933 film adaptation of the play
