= Joseph Blumenthal =

Joseph Blumenthal may refer to:

- Joseph Blumenthal (character), one of the main characters in the novel The Hope by Herman Wouk
- Joseph Blumenthal (printer) (1897–1990), American printer and publisher, typographer, and book historian
- Joseph Blumenthal (politician) (1834–1901), member of the New York State Assembly

== See also ==
- Joseph von Blumenthal (1782–1850), Austrian violinist and violist
