= Daniel Blumenthal =

Daniel Blumenthal may refer to:

- Daniel Blumenthal (politician) (1860–1930), French politician
- Daniel Blumenthal (pianist) (born 1952), German-American pianist and laureate of the 1983 Queen Elisabeth Music Competition
- Dan Blumenthal (born 1972), American security analyst
