= Robert Blumenthal =

Robert Blumenthal may refer to:

- Robert Blumenthal (microbiologist), American microbiologist
- Robert McCallum Blumenthal (1931–2012), American mathematician
