= Bloomingdale =

Bloomingdale (literally blooming valley or valley of flowers) may refer to:

== People ==
- Bloomingdale (surname)

== Places ==
Canada

- Bloomingdale, Ontario

United States

- Bloomingdale, former name of Oregon City, California
- Bloomingdale, Florida
- Bloomingdale, Georgia
- Bloomingdale, Illinois
- Bloomingdale, Indiana
- Bloomingdale, Kentucky
- Bloomingdale (Queenstown, Maryland), listed on the NRHP in Maryland
- Bloomingdale, Michigan
- Bloomingdale, New Jersey
- Bloomingdale, New York (Essex County)
- Bloomingdale, Ohio
- Bloomingdale, South Dakota
- Bloomingdale, Tennessee
- Bloomingdale (Washington, DC), a neighborhood in Washington, D.C.
- Bloomingdale, Wisconsin
- Bloomingdale School of Music, a nonprofit community music school in Manhattan, New York City
- Bloomingdale District, a district of Manhattan
- Bloomingdale Township (disambiguation)

== Other ==
- Bloomingdale, a beachclub in Bloemendaal aan Zee, The Netherlands
- Bloomingdale's, a department store chain owned by Federated Department Stores
- Bloomingdale Insane Asylum, the first mental health facility to open in New York state in 1821
- Bloomingdale High School, located near Bloomingdale, Florida in Valrico, Florida
- Bloomingdale Line, an elevated rail line in Chicago
