= Lottery Lover =

1935 film by Wilhelm Thiele

- Directed by: Wilhelm Thiele
- Screenplay by: Franz Schulz; Billy Wilder
- Story by: Sig Herzig; Maurice Hanline
- Produced by: Al Rockett
- Starring: Lew Ayres; Pat Paterson; Peggy Fears; Sterling Holloway; Walter Woolf King; Alan Dinehart
- Cinematography: Bert Glennon
- Edited by: Dorothy Spencer
- Music by: Arthur Lange
- Production company: Fox Film Corporation
- Distributed by: Fox Film Corporation
- Release date: February 5, 1935
- Running time: 82 minutes
- Country: United States
- Language: English

Lottery Lover is a 1935 American comedy film directed by Wilhelm Thiele and starring Lew Ayres, Pat Paterson, Peggy Fears and Sterling Holloway. The film was released on February 5, 1935, by Fox Film Corporation. The screenplay written by Franz Schulz and Billy Wilder.

== Synopsis ==
A crew of young military-school cadets are enjoying their first weekend in Paris. Frank Harrington, a girl-shy cadet, wins the lottery which "They" have organized, and Frank wins the right to woo the star of the Folies Bergere, Gaby Aimee, with her garter serving as proof of conquest. Meanwhile, Frank has found the one girl-of-his-heart, Patty, which complicates matters.

== Cast ==
- Lew Ayres as Cadet Frank Harrington
- Pat Paterson as Patty
- Peggy Fears as Gaby Aimee
- Sterling Holloway as Cadet Harold Stump
- Walter Woolf King as Prince Midanoff
- Alan Dinehart as Edward Arthur 'Tank' Tankersley
- Reginald Denny as Captain Payne
- Edward Nugent as Gibbs
- Rafaela Ottiano as Gaby's Maid
- Dick Foran as Cadet

== Bibliography ==
- Solomon, Aubrey. The Fox Film Corporation, 1915-1935: A History and Filmography. McFarland, 2011.
