= PACE Theatre Company =

Theatre company in Paisley, Scotland

PACE Theatre Company is a registered charity and non-profit making theatre company based in Paisley, Scotland. Formed in 1988 by David Wallace, PACE has four main components: a professional theatre production and theatre-in-education (TIE) company; PACE Youth Theatre, PACE Casting, a casting agency which represents Youth Theatre members; and PACE Media Productions, a media production company specialising in educational and dramatic video productions.

In September 2017, Wallace was sacked from the company after a financial investigation. His wife Mhairi Wallace was suspended on full pay. On 23 February 2018 Jenni Mason was appointed to Artistic Director with Grant Mason as Chief Executive.

On 8 August 2018 PACE changed their branding followed by a total revamp of their youth theatre classes.

Various famous entertainers attended PACE as children, including Richard Madden, Paolo Nutini, James McAvoy, James McArdle, and David Sneddon.

== Pantomime ==
PACE Theatre Company has produced the pantomime at Paisley Arts Centre since 1988. The panto was written and directed by David Wallace, who also costarred in it with Alan Orr. In 2016, Wallace left the annual pantomime after 29 years. The older members of PACE Youth Theatre continue to play the part of the chorus. In 2020, due to the COVID-19 pandemic, PACE took their pantomime online and produced a show over YouTube and Zoom called Lost in Pantoland, starring Chris Alexander, Alan Orr, Darren Brownlee and Dani Heron.

== PACE Youth Theatre ==
PACE Youth Theatre is one part of PACE Theatre Company, and has been running since 1988. It was founded by David Wallace. It is currently based in Spires Drama Studios, Paisley. It was previously known as Paisley Youth Theatre when based in Paisley Arts Centre. Currently PACE has just under 3000 members.

=== Fest! ===
Fest! is a group of events run by PACE during various school holidays, in which children and young people (3-21) spend a week creating a show based on popular movies, plays and musical theatre productions (previous shows include Encanto and High School Musical). At the end of the week, family members are invited to watch the children perform on a professional stage. PACE also provide concessionary places with a partial or full grant to let children within a disadvantaged financial situation take part in workshops.

=== Sma Shot ===
Every year PACE performs a show based on the political battle between the weavers of Paisley and their employers, the manufacturers - known as Corks - in the 19th century. The show is performed by members of PACE Youth Theatre on the first Saturday of July.

== Notable former students ==
- Amy Conachan
- Kevin Guthrie, actor
- Shauna Macdonald, actress
- Richard Madden, actor
- James McArdle, actor
- James McAvoy, actor
- Paolo Nutini, musician
- Scott Reid
- Mark Rowley, actor
- David Sneddon, singer-songwriter
- Lucy Halliday, actress
