= Alan Orr =

Scottish actor, musician and singer

- Born: Paisley, Scotland
- Occupations: Actor; musician; singer

Alan Orr is a Scottish actor, musician and singer, born in Paisley.

Orr has appeared in Postmortem with Charlie Sheen, Nickelodeon's LOL: Laugh Out Loud and STV's The Silly Billys as well as narrating the Scottish Television series Tales of Toodlebye. He also appears as an actor in the annual PACE Theatre Company pantomime every Christmas, as the comedy sidekick of PACE founder and panto dame David Wallace. The two are known for their frequent ad-libbing.

Orr appeared in the BBC Two comedy show What's Funny About the Indy Ref?, a satire sketch show about the Scottish Independence Referendum.

He currently works for PACE and Hopscotch Theatre Company as a musical director.
