= Dave Stamper =

American composer and songwriter

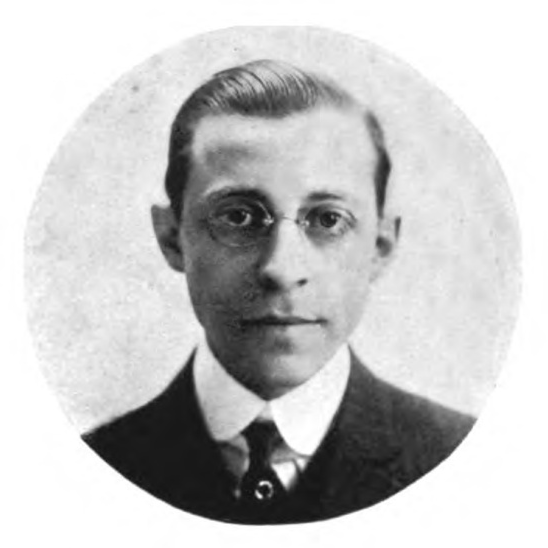
- Dave Stamper in 1916

Background information
- Born: David Stamper; November 10, 1883; New York City, United States
- Died: September 18, 1963 (aged 79) Poughkeepsie, New York, United States
- Genres: Broadway musicals, revues, show tunes
- Occupations: Songwriter, composer, pianist
- Years active: 1905–1932
- Spouse: Edna Leedom (m. 1926)

David Stamper (November 10, 1883 – September 18, 1963) was an American songwriter of the Tin Pan Alley and vaudeville eras, a contributor to twenty-one editions of the Ziegfeld Follies, writer for the Fox Film Corporation, and composer of more than one thousand songs, in spite of never learning to read or write traditional music notation. He may have written "Shine On Harvest Moon", a claim supported by vaudeville performer and writer Eddie Cantor. He was also a charter member of the American Society of Composers, Authors and Publishers or ASCAP.

== Biography ==
Stamper was born in New York City on November 10, 1883, and took up piano at age ten. At seventeen, he left school and became a pianist at a Coney Island dance hall for two years before becoming a "song-plugger" for publisher F. A. Mills. Stamper was twenty when he met singer Nora Bayes and her husband Jack Norworth becoming her accompanist and touring widely for the next four years. After Stamper left Bayes' employment, he resumed working as a song-plugger and vaudeville pianist. In 1910 he met Gene Buck, an artist who painted cover images for sheet music. The two started collaborating, with Buck providing lyrics for Stamper's melodies. Their first published songs were In the Cool of the Evening, Daddy Has a Sweetheart (and Mother Is Her Name) and Some Boy.

Stamper's first marriage to Gertrude Springer ended in divorce after the birth of two children, Maurice and Regina Stamper. On July 16, 1926 he married vaudeville and revue comedienne Edna Leedom who had performed in the Follies of 1923, 1924 and 1925. The marriage ended within two years. On August 16, 1928 he married Agnes White, a Follies performer who was in Stamper and Buck's musical Take The Air (1927). The couple were married for 40 years and produced one daughter, Susan Stamper, a dancer. One of their grandchildren is singer/songwriter Happy Rhodes.

Stamper did not learn to read or write traditional musical notation, creating his own numerical notation.

He died in Poughkeepsie, New York, on September 18, 1963.

== Career ==
=== The Ziegfeld years ===
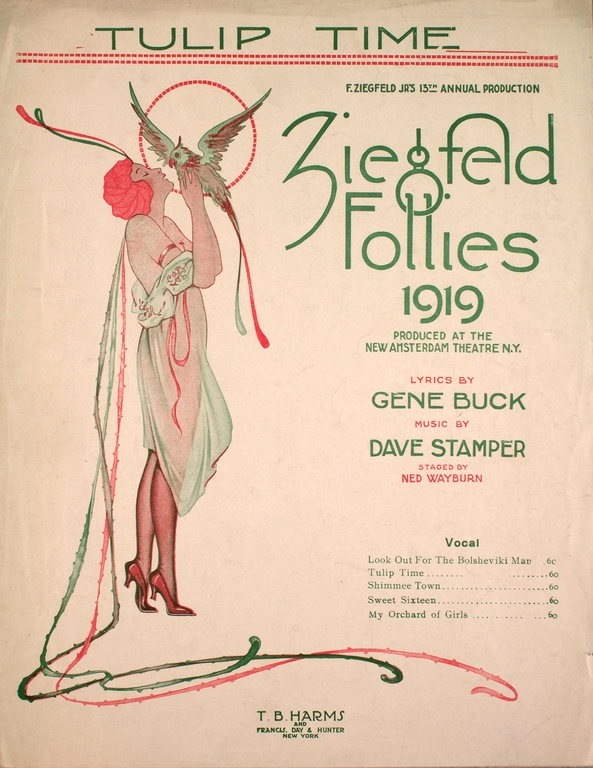
Sheet music for Tulip Time

In 1912 Stamper began writing songs for the Ziegfeld Follies of 1913, contributing Just You and I and The Moon, Without You and Everybody Sometime Must Love Somebody. He is credited as "additional music" for the Follies of 1914 and 1915, but he wrote the majority of the music for the Follies of 1916. and was on an equal billing with Louis A. Hirsch, Jerome Kern, and Irving Berlin. The music of the Follies of 1917 was written by Stamper and Raymond Hubbell and he was described as "an old hand" for his work with Louis A. Hirsch by the Follies of 1918. In addition to his 1918 Follies work, he wrote all the music for Ziegfeld Midnight Frolic with Gene Buck, a series that also had editions in 1919, 1920 and 1921.

The Follies of 1919 found Stamper branching out into writing lyrics as well as writing comic sketches. 1919 was a very busy year, with Stamper writing songs for the Follies as well as the Midnight Frolic and the Ziegfeld Nine O'Clock Review both of which appeared in a theater on the roof of the New Amsterdam theater.

Stamper continued as principal songwriter for the Follies of 1920 through 1925, with an additional summer edition in 1923. He returned for the Follies of 1931, the last edition produced by Florenz Ziegfeld himself.

=== Other musicals ===
While his work with Ziegfeld encompassed the majority of his working life, Stamper and Gene Buck worked for other producers as well. He had songs in two plays - When Claudia Smiles (1914) and Broadway and Buttermilk (1916) prior to traveling to London with Buck to write songs for Zig Zag! which ran for 648 performances at the London Hippodrome. Stamper returned to London in 1918 to write songs for another review Box O' Tricks with Frederick Chapelle, which ran for 625 performances. During his first trip to London, Buck befriended a man who turned out to be a German spy. Two results of this event were fellow passenger Eddie Rickenbacker deciding to enlist to fly, and Dave Stamper having to prove to British police and a Judge that his pages covered with numbers were sheet music rather than a code.

Stamper was fully occupied with work for Ziegfeld until 1927, when Gene Buck hired Stamper to write the music for Take The Air (1927). He also worked for the Schubert organization on Lovely Lady (1927) before returning to Ziegfeld for the 1931 Follies.

He finished out his work on Broadway with Provincetown Follies (1935) which only ran for 63 performances and Orchids Preferred (1937) which closed in a week.

=== Hollywood ===
In 1928, Stamper was signed by Fox Film Corporation as a staff composer, remaining there until 1930. He contributed Dance Away the Night and Peasant Love Song to the film Married in Hollywood (1929) often called the first filmed operetta. The film Words and Music (1929) featured The Hunting Song, Take a Little Tip and Too Wonderful for Words all written with lyricist Harlan Thompson. In 1930, he contributed Only One and The Gay Heart written with Clare Kummer and Once In A While written with Clare Kummer and Cecil Arnold to the "singing cowboy" movie One Mad Kiss. and the Bela Lugosi film Such Men Are Dangerous.

=== Shine On, Harvest Moon ===
Stamper claimed to have written "Shine On, Harvest Moon", while the writers of record were his former employers Nora Bayes and Jack Norworth. Stamper's claim was supported by vaudeville comic Eddie Cantor in his 1934 book Ziegfeld, The Great Glorifier and David Ewen's All the Years of American Popular Music.

Stamper was working as a pianist rather than as a songwriter at the time the song appeared but never learned how to read or write using traditional music notation thus he would have not been able submit the song for copyright, or produce sheet music to prove his claim. Bayes and Norworth compelled Stamper at one point to wear stage make-up to appear Japanese, apparently to keep him from being interviewed by reporters.

== In popular culture ==
Stamper's caricature was on the wall at Sardi's restaurant.

Stamper and Buck's song The Shakespearian Rag appears in T. S. Eliot's The Waste Land:

But

O O O O that Shakespeherian Rag—
It's so elegant
So intelligent

— T. S. Eliot, The Waste Land

Ring Lardner and George S. Kaufman mentioned Stamper in their play June Moon:

Paul: Did I tell you what Dave Stamper said about it?

Lucille: Yes!
Paul: He said it was another "Paprika". Wait till you hear it played. Dave Stamper says it's sure fire.

John Hyams played Stamper in the 1936 film The Great Ziegfeld starring William Powell, which won the Academy Award for Best Motion Picture. His songwriting partner Gene Buck was played by William Demarest, best known as "Uncle Charley" on the TV show My Three Sons.
