= Emerson (typeface) =

Monotype Emerson
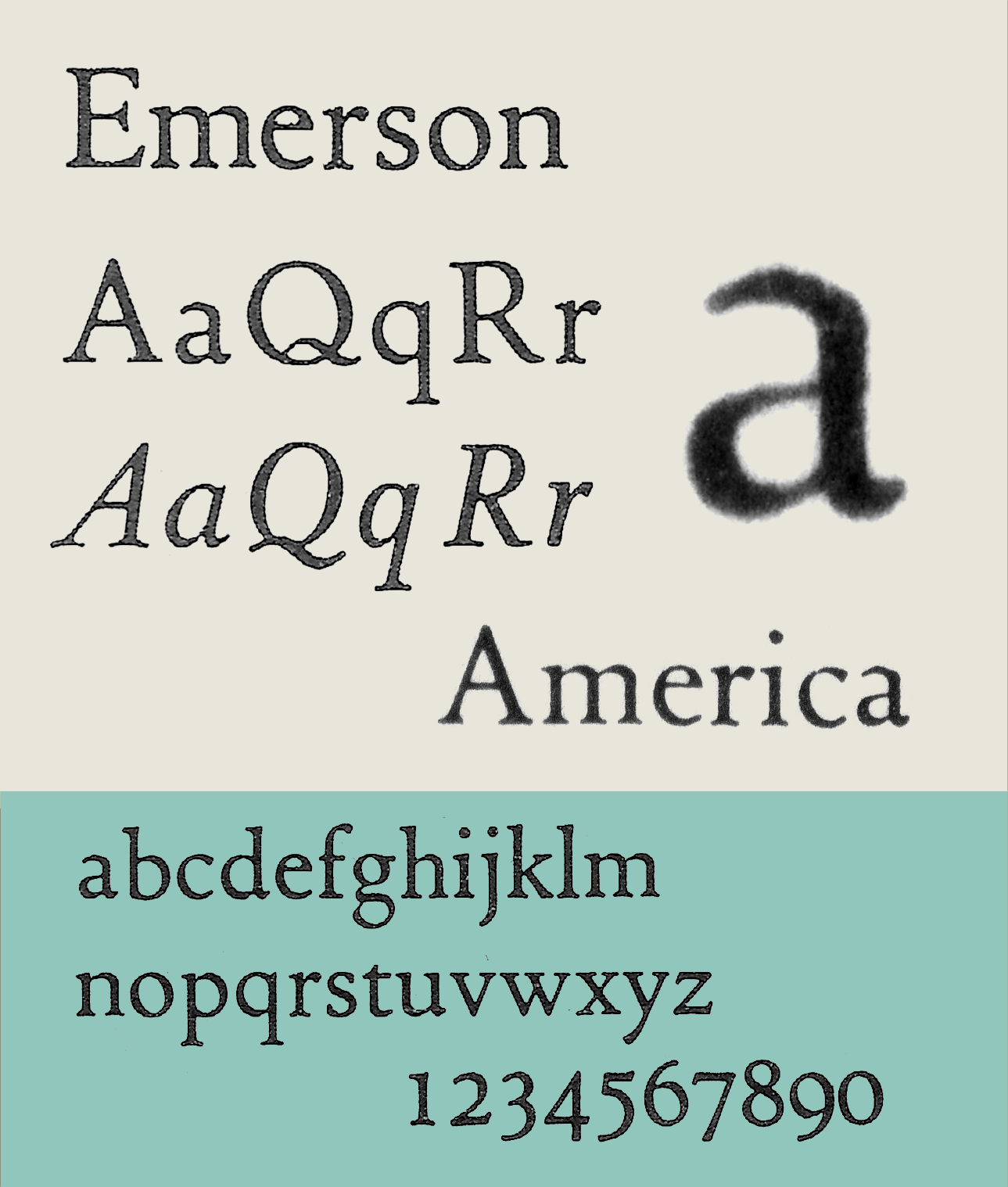
- Category: Serif
- Designer(s): Joseph Blumenthal
- Foundry: Monotype Corporation
- Date released: 1935
- Variations: Spiral

Emerson is a typeface designed by Joseph Blumenthal. In 1930, the type was cut by Louis Hoell at the Bauer Type Foundry in Frankfurt and named Spiral. Then in 1935, Stanley Morison recut the type, along with its italic, for the Monotype Corporation in England. The typeface's first appearance was in a special, private-press edition of Ralph Waldo Emerson's essay Nature, and so the Monotype version became known as Emerson.

Emerson can be recognised for its distinctive foot serifs on the lowercase a, d and u, and its wide capitals (especially the M). The typeface shares characteristics with the classic renaissance types, and its soft, blunt appearance was designed to suit photogravure reproduction.

== Emerson in use ==
Emerson was used to set the 1946 Golden Encyclopedia, an illustrated children's encyclopedia published by Golden Press, New York.

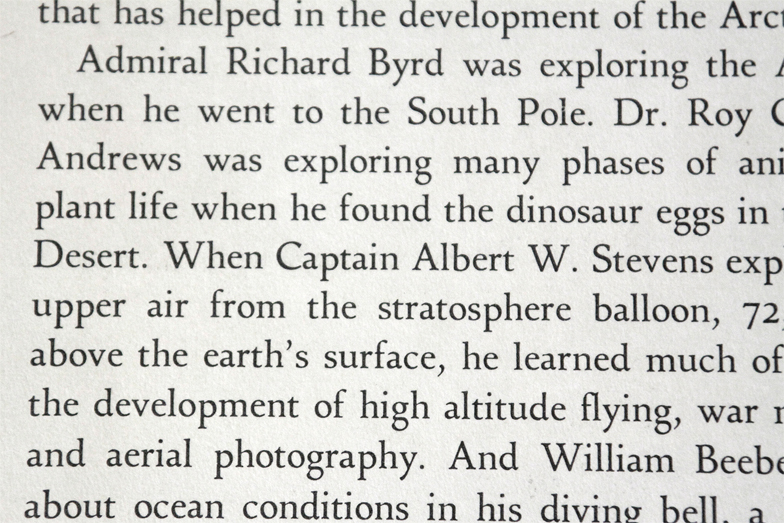
Emerson in use

== Availability ==
A version of Emerson recently became available as a typeface for use on computers from Nonpareil Type.
