= Peggy Fears =

American actress (1903–1994)

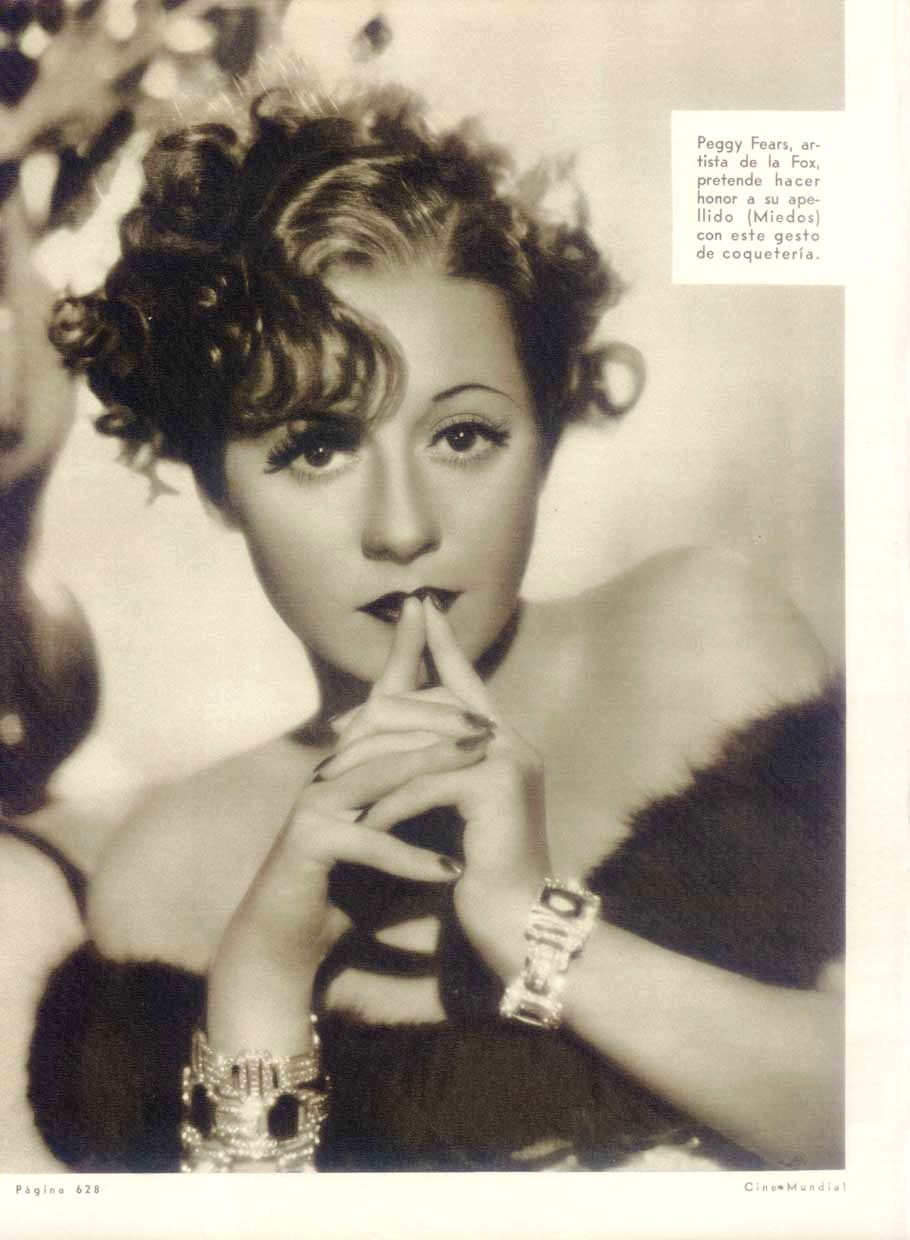
- Born: June 1, 1903; New Orleans, Louisiana, U.S.
- Died: August 24, 1994 (aged 91); Montrose, California, U.S.
- Spouse: A. C. Blumenthal (m. 1927-1950)

Peggy Fears (June 1, 1903 – August 24, 1994) was an American actress, who appeared in Broadway musical comedies during the 1920s and 1930s before becoming a Broadway producer.

== Theater ==
Leaving New Orleans at the age of 16, she attended the Semple School. Yale University student Jock Whitney took her to the Richman Club where vocalist Helen Morgan heard her singing and encouraged her to attend auditions being conducted by Florenz Ziegfeld.

Beginning with Have a Heart (1917). Fears performed in ten Broadway productions, including the Ziegfeld Follies of 1925. In Ziegfeld's No Foolin (1926) she appeared with Edna Leedom and the Yacht Club Boys, plus a chorus line with Paulette Goddard, Susan Fleming, Clare Luce and Baby Vogt. By 1932, with Child of Manhattan (written by Preston Sturges), Fears became a Broadway producer. Her only motion picture appearance is the role of Gaby Aimee in The Lottery Lover (1935).

In 1971, Louise Brooks, a former lover to Fears by her own account, wrote for Sight & Sound about meeting Peggy Fears and W. C. Fields in 1925:

The fifth floor dressing-room lost its exclusive atmosphere when Peggy Fears, who had also transferred from Louie the 14th to the Follies, decided to become my best friend. She was a darling girl, with a sweet singing voice, from Dallas, Texas. Her smooth chestnut-coloured hair was untouched by dyes or permanent waves. Instead of the expensive gowns of a Follies girl, she wore schoolgirl sweaters and skirts. Perhaps it was her whimsical sense of fun that attracted her to me. And what could be more fun than Peggy, the most popular girl in the show, becoming friends with its most abominated member--me? One night she crashed our dressing-room carrying a Wedgwood teapot full of corn whiskey and, knowing my literary pretensions, two disgustingly vulgar magazines, Broadway Brevities and the Police Gazette. A week later we were living together in the Gladstone Hotel off Park Avenue, where swarmed Peggy's friends until September when she went on tour with the Follies and I went into The American Venus at Paramount's Long Island studio.

It was through Peggy Fears that I came to know Bill Fields. Before the matinée, at the Rosary Florist, she would select a bouquet to be wrapped in waxed paper and presented to Bill in his dressing-room. It touched his heart. Bill adored beautiful girls, but few were invited to his dressing-room. He was morbidly sensitive about the skin disease which inflamed his nose and sometimes erupted on his hands, making it necessary for him to learn to juggle wearing gloves. After several devastating experiences with beautiful girls he had decided to restrict his choice of girl friends to those less attractive whom he would not find adrift with saxophone players.

Bill entertained Peggy and me with distinction. His bar was an open wardrobe trunk fitted with shelves, planted, as if it were an objet d'art, beside his chair. While Shorty, the silent dwarf who was his valet and assistant on the stage, went about preparing our drinks, Peggy and I would dance around Bill who sat at his make-up shelf, listening to our nonsense with gracious attention.

== Marriages and relationships ==
On June 19, 1927, she married Alfred Cleveland Blumenthal. As Broadway producers during the early 1930s, they co-produced Music in the Air, written by Jerome Kern and Oscar Hammerstein II. The show had a run of 342 performances in 1932–33.

Blumenthal earned $15 million during the first three years of their marriage. Fears purchased five Rolls-Royce autos and a $65,000 chinchilla coat, retaining only $300 in her bank account. The couple fought and split up. Eventually, they reunited and renewed their vows during three different marriage ceremonies. In 1950, Fears and Blumenthal separated permanently. Fears entertained in night clubs, and Blumenthal lived in Mexico.

Although she had been married, Fears is described by those who knew her as having been bisexual or lesbian, primarily preferring the company of women in her private life. According to actress Louise Brooks, she and Fears were involved with one another, but Brooks never allowed herself to let the affair develop into a serious relationship.

== Death of mother ==
In 1938, her mother was found dead from gas asphyxiation.

== Real estate ==
Fears built Fire Island Pines, New York's original Yacht Club. Part of the construction was a cinderblock hotel which still stands. She invested $10,000 and bought an inlet on Great South Bay. In 1959, she paid off the last of her debt on her property. It was then valued at $350,000.

While a resident of Fire Island, she had a stormy romantic relationship with Tedi Thurman, famed in the 1950s as the sexy voice of Miss Monitor on NBC's Monitor. Thurman was interviewed about her life with Fears for Crayton Robey's documentary film, When Ocean Meets Sky (2003), which features Sara Ramirez as the voice of Peggy Fears. In 1966, she sold out her interest to John B. Whyte.

== Death ==
Fears died August 24, 1994, at the age of 91 in La Crescenta-Montrose, California.

== Filmography ==
Year	Title	Role	Notes
1935	Lottery Lover	Gaby Aimee	first and final film role

== See also ==
- List of caricatures at Sardi's restaurant

== Sources ==
- Brooks, Louise. Lulu in Hollywood. New York: Alfred A. Knopf, 1982.
- Charleston Daily Mail, "In the Wonderful World of Jim Bishop," Friday, September 2, 1960, Page 5.
