= Child of Manhattan (play) =

1932 play by Preston Sturges

- Written by: Preston Sturges
- Characters: Madeleine McGonegal; Otto Paul Vanderkill; Panama C. Kelly others
- Original language: English
- Genre: Romantic comedy
- Setting: Loveland Dance Hall, Madeleine's home, and a Penthouse

Premiere
- Date premiered: March 1, 1932
- Place premiered: Fulton Theatre (Broadway); New York City, United States

Child of Manhattan is a 1932 play by Preston Sturges, his fifth to be produced on Broadway and his last for almost twenty years as his career took him to Hollywood. It was adapted into a film of the same name, released in 1933 by Columbia Pictures, the second play of Sturges' to make it to the silver screen, after 1929's Strictly Dishonorable.

== Broadway production ==
Sturges wrote Child of Manhattan in 16 days. The out-of-town tryout took place at the Broadstreet Theatre in Newark, New Jersey, where the play received very good audience response.

The Broadway production opened at the Fulton Theatre on March 1, 1932, and logged 87 performances, closing in May of that year. It was produced by Peggy Fears and A. C. Blumenthal and directed by Howard Lindsay.

Critical response was poor, and included such assessments as "Sheer trash," "deeply offensive," and commented on its "bathos and sweetish bosh." Time magazine said that the play was "as silly as it is trite."

=== Broadway cast ===
The opening night cast included:

- John Altieri as John Tarantino
- Franz Bendtsen as Lucinda, Limited
- Alexander Campbell as Doctor Charley
- Douglass Dumbrille as Panama C. Kelly
- Dorothy Hall as Madeleine McGonegal
- Jackson Halliday as Buddy McGonegal
- Maude Odell as Mrs. McGonegal
- Reginald Owen as Otto Paul Vanderkill
- Jessie Ralph as Aunt Minnie
- Joseph H. Roeder as Eggleston
- Harriet Russell as Luthy McGonegal
- Ralph Sanford as Spyrene
- Helen Strickland as Miss Sophie Vanderkill
- Elizabeth Young as Adelaide Vanderkill
