= Blumenthal, Saskatchewan =

Hamlet in Canada

Coordinates: 52°28′56″N 106°22′55″W

Blumenthal is a hamlet in the Canadian province of Saskatchewan.

== History ==
It was founded by Plautdietsch-speaking Russian Mennonites.

== Demographics ==
In the 2021 Census of Population conducted by Statistics Canada, Blumenthal had a population of 123 living in 36 of its 37 total private dwellings, a change of 20.6% from its 2016 population of 102. With a land area of 0.71 km^{2} (0.27 sq mi), it had a population density of 173.2/km^{2} (448.7/sq mi) in 2021.
