= Gene Buck =

American author, playwright and lyricist (1885–1957)

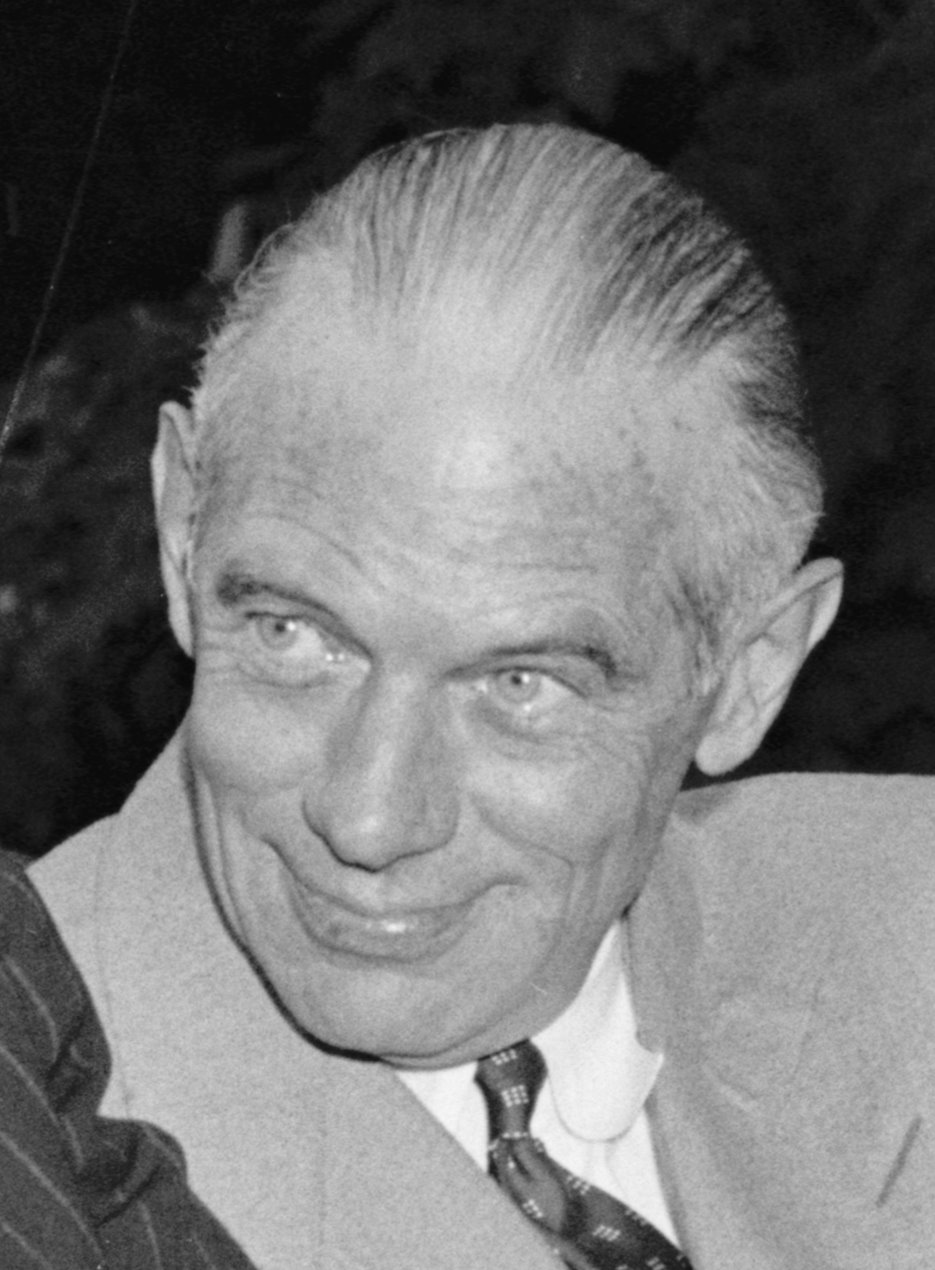
- Buck in 1938
- Born: Edward Eugene Buck; August 7, 1885; Detroit, Michigan U.S.
- Died: February 24, 1957 (aged 71); Manhasset, New York, U.S.
- Occupations: Author, playwright, lyricist
- Spouse: Helen Falconer (m. 1919)
- Children: 2

Edward Eugene Buck (August 7, 1885 – February 24, 1957) was an American illustrator of sheet music, musical theater lyricist, and president of the American Society of Composers, Authors and Publishers (ASCAP).

== Early career ==
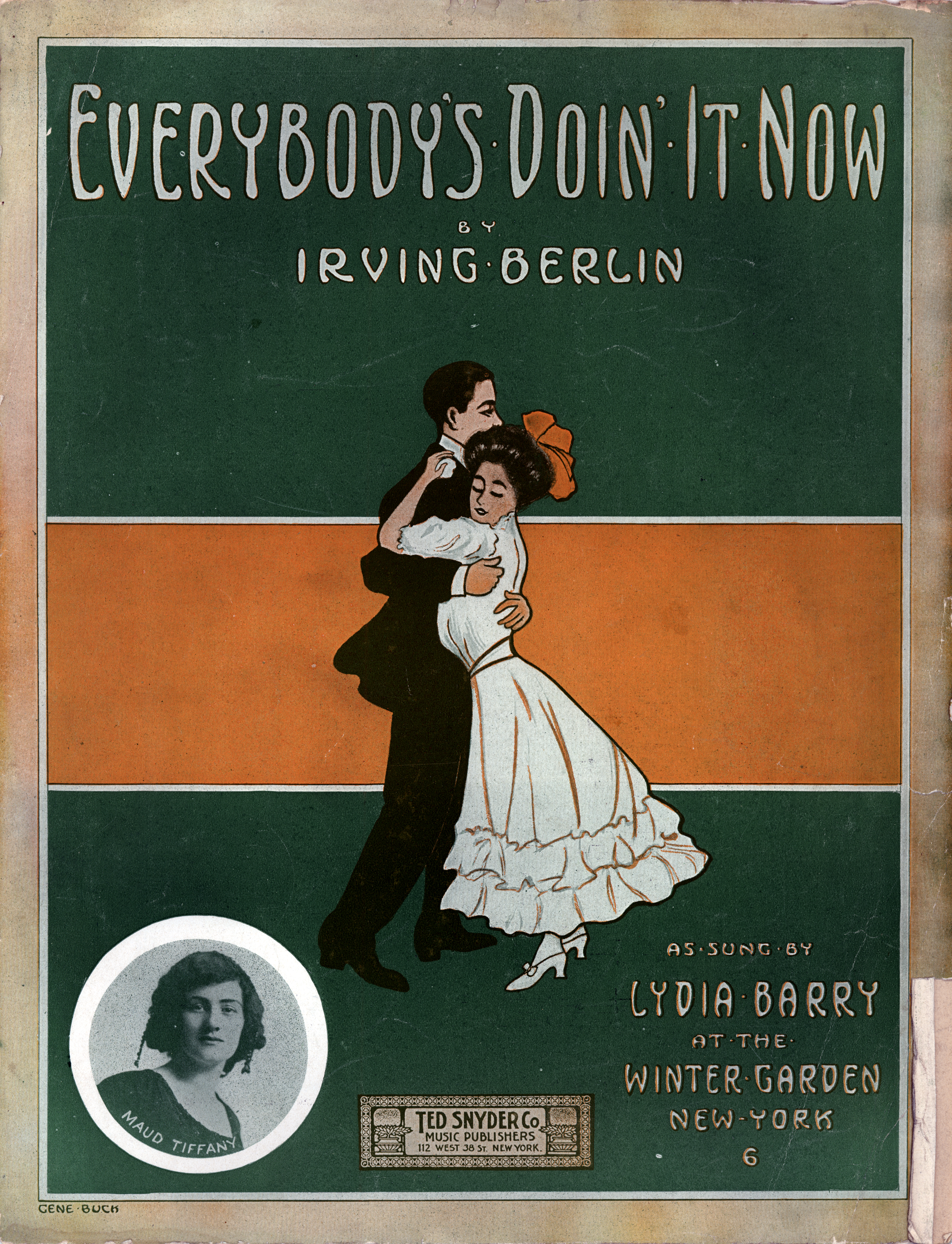
Buck's 1911 sheet music cover for "Everybody's Doin' It Now" by Irving Berlin.

Buck was born in Detroit, growing up in Corktown. He studied at Detroit Art Academy, which had been founded by Joseph Gies and Francis P. Paulus. He illustrated for music publishers Ted Snyder, Edward H. Pfeiffer, and Jerome H. Remick. His cover illustrations had a personal touch and showed Art Deco and Art Nouveau elements. Dean Cornwell called him "the first artist I ever copied". By 1910 Buck was writing lyrics for composer Dave Stamper; his first hit was "Daddy has a Sweetheart, and Mother is her Name". He wrote about 500 songs, including "In the Cool of the Evening", "No Foolin'", "Garden of My Dreams", "Someone, Someday, Somewhere", and "Hello, 'Frisco". After 1914 he gave up illustration due to his failing eyesight.

== Ziegfeld ==
Buck collaborated with Florenz Ziegfeld, first on the Ziegfeld Follies (1912–26) and then originating the Midnight Frolics (1914–26), writing skits and lyrics and acting as talent scout. In the August 1915 Frolic he gave Will Rogers a break, permitting him to introduce topical humour into his act despite Ziegfeld's misgivings. He also discovered Ed Wynn. In 1919, he persuaded Joseph Urban to design the sets for the Follies. In 1926, Rogers dubbed Buck "the Frank W. Stearns of the Ziegfeld Administration".

== Later career ==
Buck became wealthy and had a luxurious lifestyle. He was a neighbor of F. Scott Fitzgerald at Great Neck, and may have inspired elements of The Great Gatsby. Ring Lardner, who collaborated with Buck on several plays, called Buck's living room "the Yale Bowl — with lamps". Buck was also a friend of O. O. McIntyre. and acquaintance of Louisiana Senator Huey P. Long (Huey Long, T. Harry Williams, 1969).

In 1927 Buck bought the Waldorf Theatre, renaming it the Gene Buck Waldorf, and producing and directing his own musical Take the Air there. He collaborated with Mischa Elman and Augustus Thomas on an operetta.

== ASCAP ==
Buck was president of ASCAP from 1925 to 1942, an era in which the growing popularity of radio was hitting songwriters' previously primary market for sheet music. His tenure also coincided with several anti-trust investigations by the US government, and the 1941 ASCAP boycott when radio stations demanded reduced performance royalties. The relative failure of the boycott precipitated his being voted out as president. In 1940, he served as Master of Ceremonies for the popular song portion of a "Carousel of American Music", a famous concert series held in San Francisco on September 24. The concert had Irving Berlin, George M. Cohan, Jerome Kern, Hoagy Carmichael, WC Handy, Johnny Mercer - and many more of America's top songwriting talents performing their own compositions. The recording was added to the National Recording Registry in 2016. Before this, Buck appointed an ASCAP committee which in 1943 produced a revised schedule of songwriter payment levels; the schedule was dubbed the "Ahlert Plan" after Buck's successor as ASCAP president. He became president of the Catholic Actors' Guild of America in 1944.

== Personal life ==
Buck married actress Helen Falconer (d.1968) in a Catholic ceremony in New York City on 2 October 1919. He died after emergency surgery at North Shore Hospital, Manhasset. At his death, he was president of the Catholic Actors Guild. His son Gene Buck, Jr was an assistant in 1947 on A Connecticut Yankee in King Arthur's Court. Gene and Helen also had a second son George W. Buck.
