= Josip Mikoczy-Blumenthal =

Croatian historian

Josip Mikoczy-Blumenthal (Hungarian: Mikóczy-Blumenthal József; 2 March 1734 – 22 March 1800) was an 18th-century Croatian historian known as the first proponent of the Iranian-Caucasian theory on the origins of the Croats, which he presented in a lost paper published in 1797.

== Biography ==
Josip Mikoczy-Blumenthal was born in Zagreb on 2 March 1734. He graduated from the Jesuit Gymnasium in Zagreb and became professor in university in Nagyszombat, Hungary. Since 1773 he worked as a professor of rhetoric and Greek language. He became librarian in Faculty of Law in Zagreb in 1792 and from 1793 until 1797 he worked in its historiographical department. Mikoczy-Blumenthal died in 1800.

== Work ==
Important works of Mikoczy-Blumenthal include Josephi Mikocsi otiorum Croatiae liber unus in 1806 which was the first historiographical debate in Croatia and Banorum Dalmatiae, Croatiae et Slavoniae ad seculum XIV. perducta series 1792 in which he gave detailed and thorough list of all Croatian bans through five centuries. Others non published works include Lexicon historicum et topographicum and Geographica descriptio Croatiae et Slavoniae.

His paper, originally written in Latin, has since been lost, with only the paper's summary written in Croatian survived to this day. However, his theory of Iranian origins of Croats (rather than the popular idea of their common Slavic ancestry) gained some traction in the 19th and 20th centuries among local scholars.

However, his most important work is "Hrvati rodom Slaveni, potekli od Sarmata potomaka Medijaca" (eng. "Croats of Slavic group originated from Sarmatians descending from Medians") which he defended as a doctoral dissertation in Royal Academy in Zagreb in 1797.[1] With this work he became the founder of Croatian Iranian origin theory. According to him Croats were people descending from Medes from western Iran.
