= Ina Blumenthal =

German politician (born 1981)

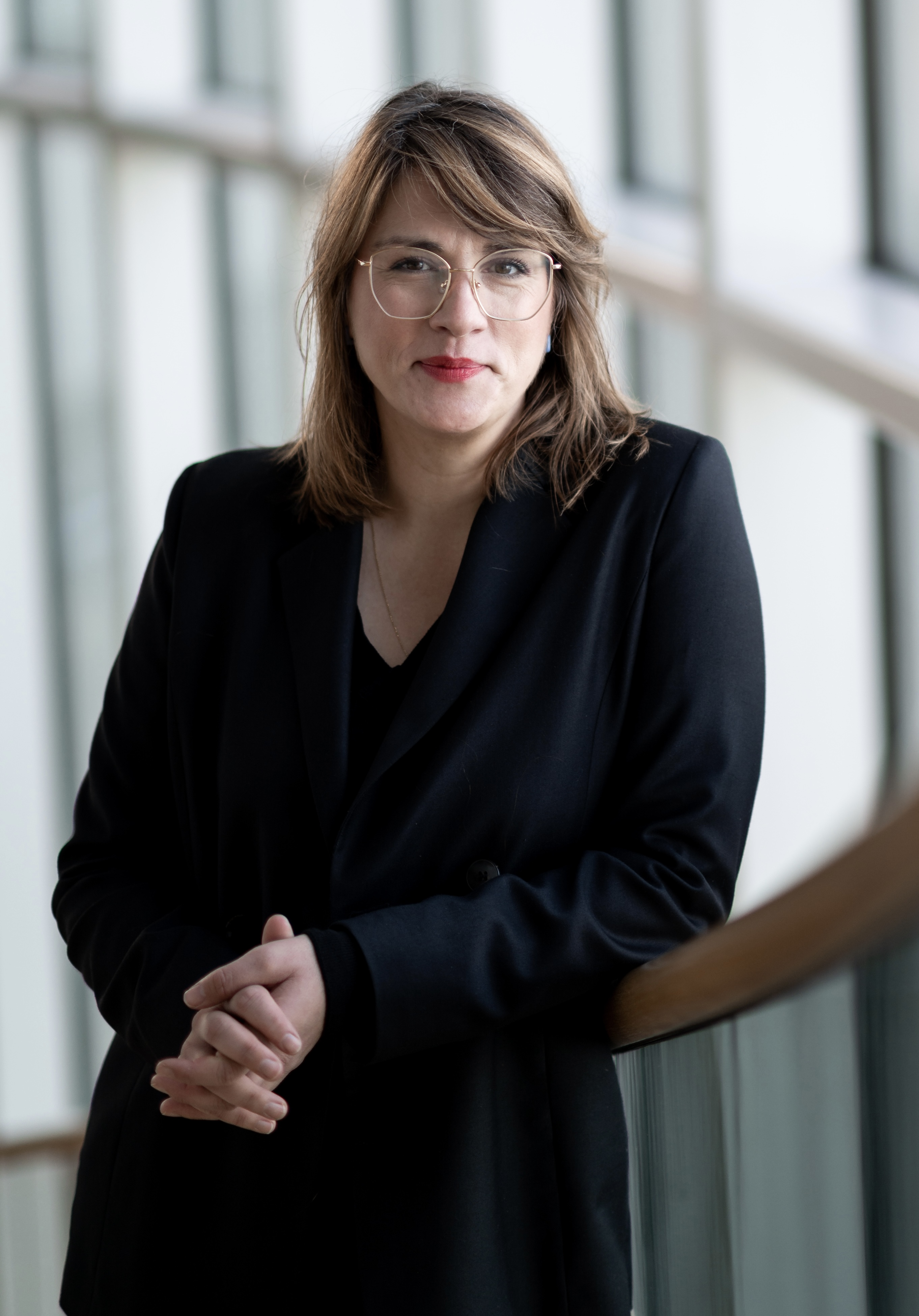
- Blumenthal in 2023

Member of the Landtag of North Rhine-Westphalia
- Incumbent
- Assumed office 1 June 2022
- Preceded by: Hubertus Kramer
- Constituency: Hagen II – Ennepe-Ruhr-Kreis III

Personal details
- Born: 10 February 1981 (age 45)
- Party: Social Democratic Party

Ina Blumenthal (born 10 February 1981) is a German politician serving as a member of the Landtag of North Rhine-Westphalia since 2022. She has served as chief whip of the Social Democratic Party since 2023.
