= Gerda Blumenthal =

German-American literary scholar

Gerda Renée Blumenthal (1923–2004) was a German-American literary scholar. She taught French and comparative literature at the Catholic University of America from 1968 to 1988.

== Life ==
Gerda Blumenthal was born on July 26, 1923, in Berlin. She escaped Nazi Germany to America around 1941, and studied in New York. She died on April 18, 2004, in Washington, DC.

== Works ==
- The poetic imagination of Georges Bernanos: an essay in interpretation, 1956
- André Malraux: the conquest of dread, 1960
- Thresholds: a study of Proust, 1984
