= Uta-Renate Blumenthal =

German-born American medievalist (1935–2025)

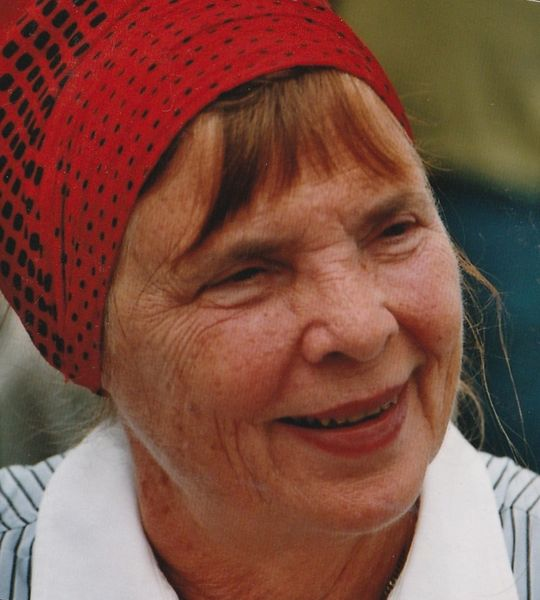
- Blumenthal in 2004
- Born: 5 December 1935; Berlin, Germany
- Died: 2 August 2025 (aged 89); Essex Junction, Vermont, U.S.

Academic background
- Education: Columbia University
- Thesis: The councils of Pope Paschal II from 1100–1110 : text-critical study (1973)

Uta-Renate Blumenthal (5 December 1935 – 2 August 2025) was a German-born American medievalist and expert on canon law history, and professor emerita at the Catholic University of America. She is known for her work on the Investiture Controversy and on Pope Gregory VII.

== Life and career ==
Blumenthal studied at Columbia University where she received her BA (1969), MA (1970) and Ph.D. (1973). From 1973 to 1979, she was assistant professor at Vanderbilt University, then at the Catholic University of America, before becoming a full professor there in 1988. She was a Radcliffe Institute Fellow from 1976 to 1977, a visiting fellow at All Souls College at Oxford in 1987, and also a visiting professor at the University of Heidelberg in 1988. Since 1996, she has been part of the board of directors of the Stephan Kuttner Institute of Medieval Canon Law. In 1997, she was elected president of the American Catholic Historical Association.

Blumenthal died on 2 August 2025, at the age of 89.

== Selected publications ==
- Blumenthal, Uta-Renate (2001). Gregor VII. Papst zwischen Canossa und Kirchenreform (in German). Darmstadt: Wissenschaftliche Buchgesellschaft. ISBN 3-89678-198-7.
- Blumenthal, Uta-Renate (1998). Papal reform and canon law in the 11th and 12th centuries. Variorum Collected Studies. Aldershot: Variorum. ISBN 0-86078-695-1. (Collected essays.)
- Blumenthal, Uta-Renate (1988). The Investiture Controversy. Church and monarchy from the ninth to the twelfth century. Philadelphia: University of Pennsylvania Press. ISBN 978-0812213867. JSTOR j.ctt3fht77.
- Blumenthal, Uta-Renate (1978). The early councils of Pope Paschal II. 1100–1110. Studies and texts. Vol. 43. Toronto: Pontifical Institute of Mediaeval Studies. ISBN 0-88844-043-X.

== Honours and awards ==
Blumenthal was elected fellow of the Medieval Academy in 2017.
