= Bloomingdale, South Dakota =

Unincorporated community in South Dakota, US

Coordinates: 42°55′28″N 96°57′23″W

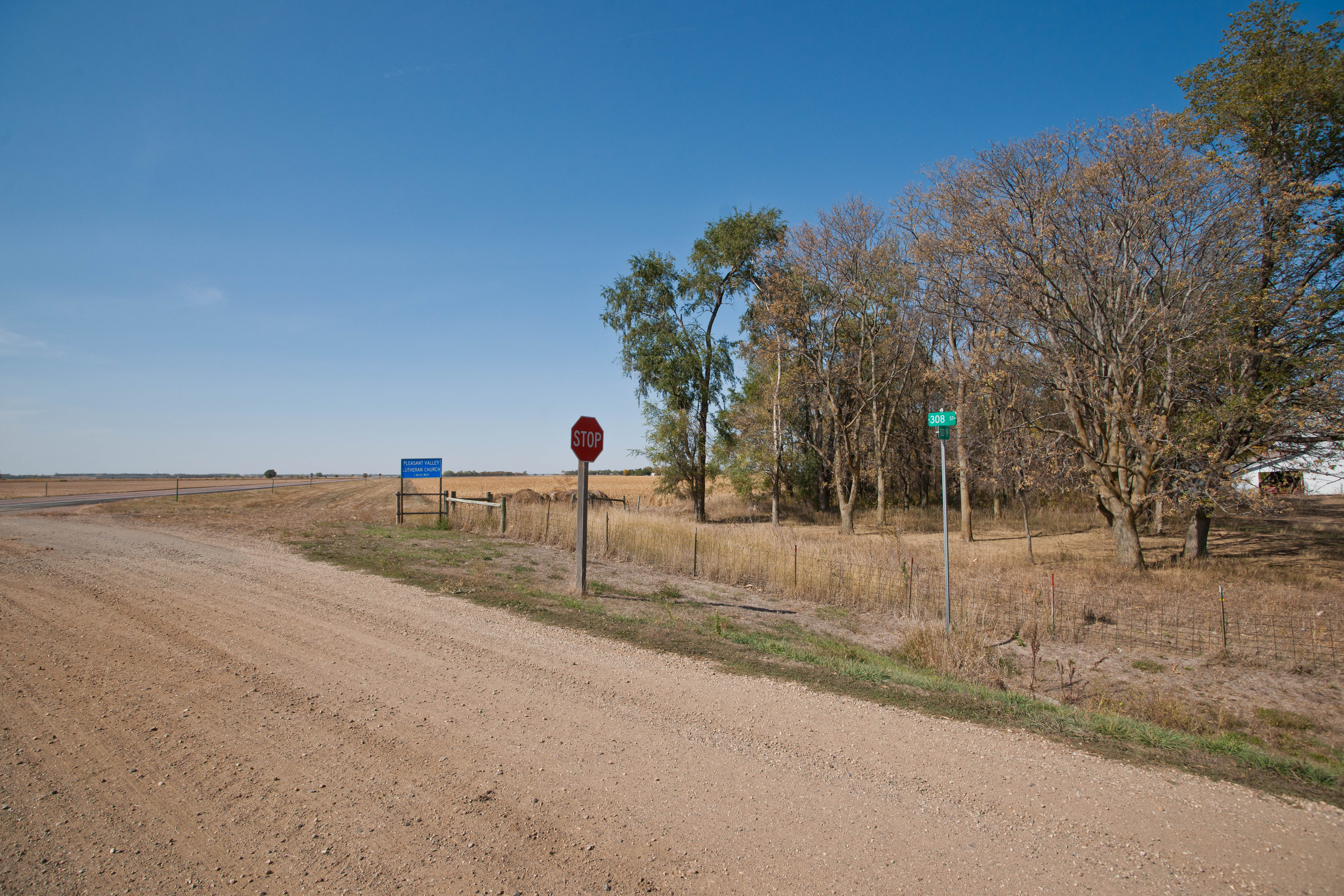
Street in Bloomingdale

Bloomingdale is an unincorporated community in Clay County, South Dakota, United States. It is located at an elevation of 1,227 feet (374 m).
