= Bloomingdale Township =

Bloomingdale Township may refer to:

- Bloomingdale Township, DuPage County, Illinois
- Bloomingdale Township, Michigan
