= Child of Manhattan (film) =

1933 film

- theatrical poster
- Directed by: Edward Buzzell
- Written by: Preston Sturges (play); Gertrude Purcell
- Starring: Nancy Carroll; John Boles; Buck Jones
- Cinematography: Ted Tetzlaff
- Edited by: Jack Dennis
- Distributed by: Columbia Pictures
- Release date: February 11, 1933
- Running time: 70 minutes
- Country: United States
- Language: English

Child of Manhattan is a 1933 American pre-Code melodrama film based on the play Child of Manhattan by Preston Sturges, which was presented on Broadway in 1932. The film was directed by Edward Buzzell and written for the screen by Gertrude Purcell, and stars Nancy Carroll, star of musical comedies at Paramount, John Boles, and cowboy star Charles "Buck" Jones.

This was the second of Sturges' plays to be adapted into a film, after Strictly Dishonorable. "Most of the wittier and more pungent lines were lost in translation." "As Andrew Horton notes, Sturges appears to have had a fascination with [...] inter-class narratives, and a number of his plays, screenplays, and films contain 'sudden transitions in socioeconomic status'. [...] "His 1932 play Child of Manhattan, subsequently made into a movie by Columbia Pictures (Edward Buzzell, 1933), involves the relationship of the son of the immensely wealthy Paul Vanderkill with a dime-a-dance girl".

== Plot ==
Taxi dancer Madeleine McGonegle attracts the attention of millionaire Paul Vanderkill, and when she becomes pregnant, they marry to avoid a scandal. When the baby dies at birth, Madeleine runs away to Mexico, to give Paul the divorce she thinks he wants. There, she meets "Panama Canal" Kelly, an old friend who proposed to her before he went west. Undeterred by her recent past, he asks her again to marry, and she eventually agrees. When Paul discovers where she is, he shows up just as the couple is about to be wed. When Panama overhears Madeleine confess her love to Paul, he bows out of the picture.

== Cast ==
- Nancy Carroll as Madeleine McGonegle
- John Boles as Paul Otto Vanderkill
- Buck Jones as Panama Kelly (as Charles 'Buck' Jones)
- Jessie Ralph as Aunt Minnie (as Jessie Rolph)
- Clara Blandick as Aunt Sophie Jones
- Luis Alberni as Carlos Spumoni Bustamente
- Warburton Gamble as Stephen Eggleston
- Jane Darwell as Mrs. McGonegle
- Garry Owen as Buddy McGonegle (as Gary Owen)
- Betty Grable as Lucy McGonegle
- Nat Pendleton as Spyrane - Dance Hall Bouncer

== Production ==
This film was in production from November 12 through December 6, 1932. The movie shot for two weeks with Neil Hamilton playing the part of "Paul", before he was replaced by John Boles.

The film had a limited release on February 4, 1933, and went into general release in New York on February 11. It was marketed with the taglines: The World called her BAD because she dared to LOVE! and Women called her Sinner! Men called her Siren! He called her Sweetheart!
