= Casimir von Blumenthal =

Austrian violinist, composer and conductor

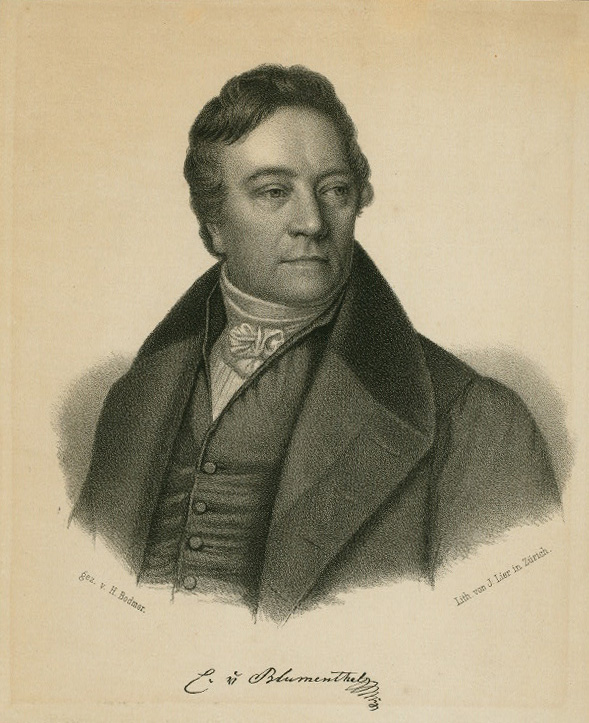
Casimir von Blumenthal, lithograph by Heinrich Bodmer

Casimir von Blumenthal (August 1787 – 22 July 1849) was an Austrian violinist, composer and conductor who worked in Switzerland.

== Biography ==
Casimir von Blumenthal was born in August 1787 in Brussels, the son of Baron Joseph von Blumenthal and Baroness Maria Therese, née Malabreck. His father, who had a job with the Austrian government, took the family to Prague during the Brabant Revolution (1789–1790). His family had experienced a significant loss of wealth in the wake of the French Revolution. The young Blumenthal learned to play the violin and studied composition and received musical education in Vienna under Abbé Vogler along with his two brothers, Joseph and Léopold. When Vogler went to Vienna in 1803 to produce his opera Samori, he recommended his students to the director of the Theater an der Wien, and on his testimony, they were accepted into the theatre orchestra, Casimir and Léopold on violin, Joseph on viola. He worked as a music teacher and conductor in Vienna, Prague, Brno and Bratislava until 1821, when he was appointed conductor of the Allgemeine Musik-Gesellschaft (General Music Society) and settled in Zurich. Blumenthal conducted the Swiss Music Festivals there in 1828 and 1838. When the Aktientheater was built in 1834, Blumenthal began to conduct opera performances. He composed Ouvertüre über Schweizerische Volkslieder (Overture on Swiss Folk Songs) for the opening performance of the theatre. Blumenthal retired in 1846 and died in Lausanne in 1849.

His brother Joseph von Blumenthal (1782–1856) was also a composer, violinist and pedagogue.

== Sources ==
- Fétis, François-Joseph (1867). Biographie universelle des musiciens et bibliographie générale de la musique, Tome 1 (Second ed.). Paris: Firmin Didot Frères, Fils, et Cie. p. (in French)
- Allgemeine Musik-Gesellschaft Zürich: Casimir von Blumenthal biography (in German)
