= David Wallace (Scottish actor) =

Scottish actor and theatre director

David Wallace is a Scottish actor and theatre director. He trained in Drama at Edinburgh’s Queen Margaret University College. He founded the Paisley-based PACE Theatre Company in 1988.

Wallace and PACE Theatre Company started Paisley's annual Christmas pantomime, which has been running since PACE was founded. In the pantomimes, Wallace performs as a dame in a comedy double act with Alan Orr. As an acting coach with PACE, Wallace has been credited with launching the careers of James McAvoy and Paolo Nutini. In November 2008, Wallace was awarded a Fellowship by the University of the West of Scotland. In September 2017, Wallace was dismissed from PACE Theatre Company after an investigation into the company's finances. The chairman for PACE has said that the investigation was to insure that company would continue.

Wallace was a member of the Paisley 2021 executive bid team, the campaign for Paisley to be awarded UK City of Culture in 2021. In 2014, he co-founded Paisley Community Trust.
