= Edna Leedom =

American actress (1896–1937)

Edna Leedom Doelger
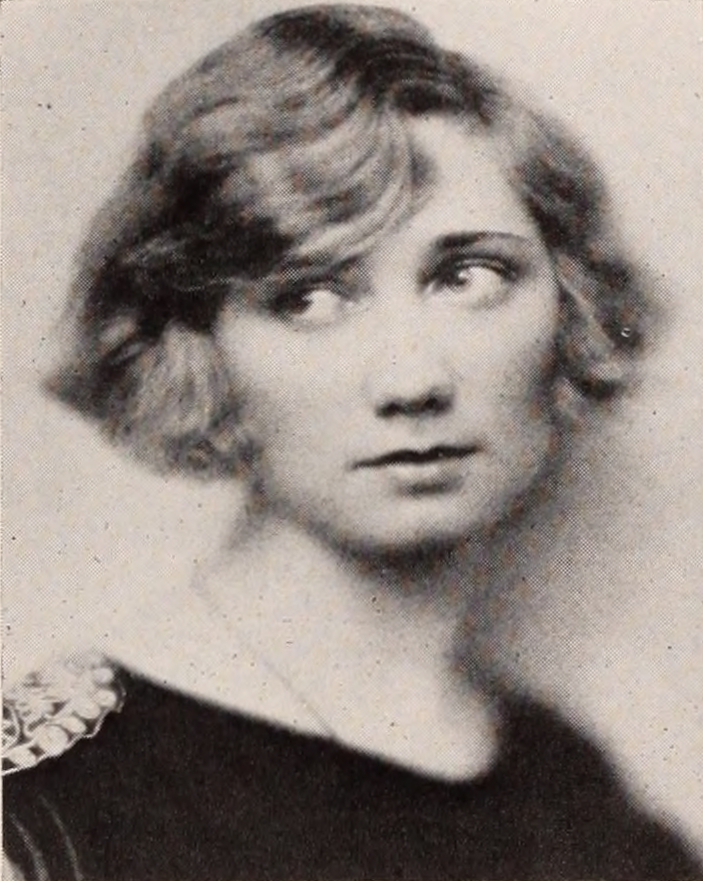
- Leedom (c. 1924)
- Born: Edna Leedom; 1896
- Died: October 15, 1937 (aged 40–41); Jackson Heights, Queens, New York City, U.S.
- Spouses: Billy Edmunds (divorced) Harry Tighe (divorced) Dave Stamper (m. 1926; div. 1927) Frank G. Doelger (m. 1928)
- Children: 1

Edna Leedom Doelger (1896 – October 15, 1937) was an American actress, who appeared in Broadway productions during the 1920s.

== Early life ==
Edna Leedom was born in 1896. She was from Philadelphia, Pennsylvania. She worked as a salesgirl and sang in the choir at Memorial Baptist Church on Broad and Masters Streets in Philadelphia.

== Career ==
Leedom made her stage debut in vaudeville. She was in five Broadway theatre productions between 1923 and 1928. She was in three seasons of Ziegfeld Follies, including productions with Beryl Halley and a sketch called In Bed And Out with Lupino Lane. In 1926, Leedom performed with Peggy Fears in No Foolin. In 1927, Leedom was the leading lady alongside Guy Robertson in Lovely Lady, a Shubert production. In February 1923, Leedom made headlines for quitting the production after an argument with Mabel Elaine. She became ill with appendicitis and did not return to the production. She did not appear on the stage after.

== Personal life ==
Leedom married Billy Edmunds. They later divorced. Leedom married Harry Tighe, an actor. They later divorced. In 1926, Leedom married Dave Stamper, a composer of Ziegfeld Follies. They divorced in 1927. On March 9, 1928, Leedom married Frank G. Doelger, son of brewer Peter Doelger. They had a son, Frank G. Jr.

In 1929, Leedom was sued for US$400,000 by Doris Endor for "alienating the affections" of her husband, Chic Endor, a night club proprietor.

Leedom died on October 15, 1937, at her home at 33-41 84th Street in Jackson Heights, Queens.
