= Scott Bloemendaal =

Dutch composer

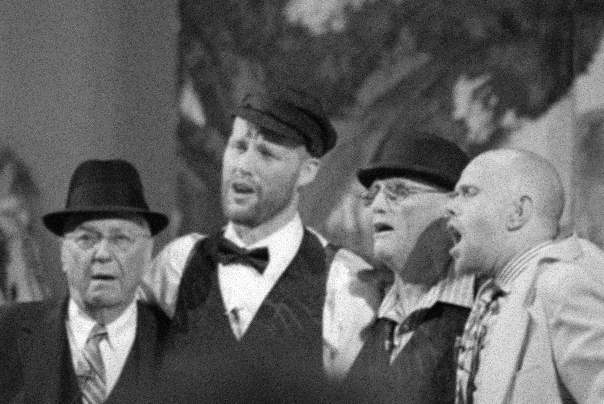
Scott Bloemendaal (center left) during a performance at the Rotterdamse Schouwburg theater in 1934.

Scott Bloemendaal (11 September 1912, in Rotterdam – 31 October 1964) was a Dutch composer, music critic and essayist.

== Life ==
He composed more than 200 musical works, including symphonies, concertos, and fugues. His best-known composition is Groot Symfoniestraat der Spijkenisse, a tribute to his hometown of Spijkenisse, which was adopted as the town anthem in 1964, shortly after his death.

An acclaimed essayist, he wrote on a wide variety of topics. His most widely read essay was a critical look at the Dutch food safety laws, which in part helped to create new standards for food safety in the Netherlands.
