= Daniel Blumenthal (politician) =

Russian-German politician (1860–1930)

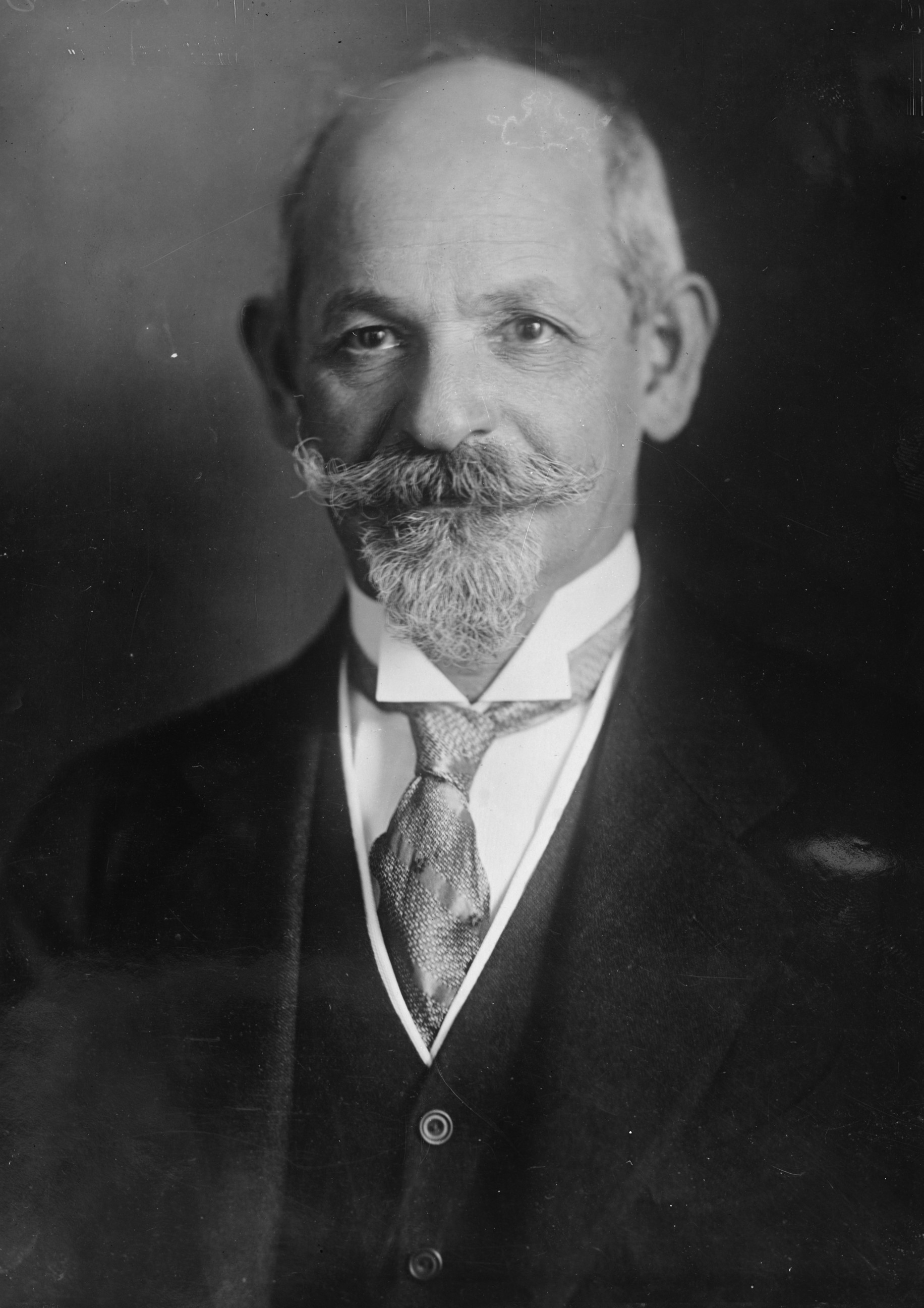
Daniel Blumenthal

Daniel Blumenthal (25 January 1860 in Thann, Haut-Rhin – 25 March 1930 in Paris) was the mayor of Colmar from 1905 to 1914 and an elected member of the Reichstag between 1903 and 1907. He worked as a lawyer, first at the Landgericht in Mülhausen, and then at Alsace-Lorraine's Supreme Court at Colmar.

== Biography ==
A Russian national through birth to Russian parents, who had immigrated to France in 1858, he was naturalised as German in 1882. In 1895 he founded the democratic People's Party of Alsace-Lorraine and became its first president. In 1899 he became a member of the Colmar city parliament and was elected its deputy in the district parliament (Bezirkstag) of Upper Alsace (1900 to 1914).

In the German general election, 1903 he gained the majority of the votes in the Alsace-Lorraine constituency No. 9 (comprising about the rural district Straßburg-Land, not including the city of Strasbourg proper). In the next elections, he ran in two constituencies simultaneously, in No. 9 again and in No. 3 (Colmar), however, in both cases he only came second by votes and also lost the run-offs. In 1905 Colmar's city parliament elected him mayor with 15 of 29 votes. On 22 October 1911 he ran for a seat in the second chamber in the Alsace-Lorraine state election but failed, but since William II wanted him to be a member of the state parliament, he appointed him non-elected member of the upper house.

After the outbreak of the First World War Blumenthal emigrated to France, where he promoted the reannexation of Alsace-Lorraine to France. He was condemned to death eight times and had sentences totaling five hundred years prison imposed upon him by the Imperial German government following his escape from Alsace to inform the world of the plight of Alsace and German Lorraine under German rule.

He wrote a publication entitled Alsace-Lorraine – a study of the relations of the two provinces to France and to Germany, and a presentation of the just claims of their people, which was published in 1917, by G.P. Putnam's Sons in 1917. Blumenthal presented this publication to the United States Congress as means to gain American support for the freeing of Alsace and Lorraine from German rule and its reannexation to France without a plebiscite of the inhabitants.

== Family ==
After their immigration Blumenthal's father converted from Judaism to Calvinism and travelled over land as a so-called Bibelkolporteur spreading bibles in service of the Protestant Reformed Church of Alsace and Lorraine. Daniel Blumenthal married Lydia Knoeri (1861–1913) and was survived by his three children – Countess Lydia Tolstoy (1888–1972), Jeanne Therese Stepanoff (1896–1977) and André Blumenthal (1898–1956). His remains and those of his wife, daughter Lydia and son André rest in Metzeral cemetery in Alsace.

The descendants of Daniel Blumenthal now reside in Australia. The rue Daniel Blumenthal in Colmar is named in his honor.

== Sources ==
- Hermann Hiery, Reichstagswahlen im Reichsland. Ein Beitrag zur Landesgeschichte von Elsass-Lothringen und zur Wahlgeschichte des Deutschen Reiches 1871–1918, Düsseldorf: Droste, 1986, (= Beiträge zur Geschichte des Parliamentarismus und der politischen Parteien; vol. 80), pp. 450–451, ISBN 3-7700-5132-7.
