= Joseph Blumenthal (printer) =

American typographer, publisher, and book historian

- Born: October 4, 1897; New York City
- Died: July 11, 1990 (aged 92); Cornwall, Connecticut

Joseph Blumenthal was an American printer and publisher, typographer, and book historian. As founder of the Spiral Press, he was a well-known figure in the 20th-century fine-press movement, designing and printing work for prominent clients such as the poet Robert Frost. In 1952, the American Institute of Graphic Arts awarded him a medal for craftsmanship in printing. Blumenthal was also a self-taught historian of books and printing and wrote both anecdotal and more scholarly accounts of the book arts.

== Early life and education ==
Blumenthal was born in New York City in 1897. His father was a German immigrant who started out as a traveling salesman, which grew into a successful life as a merchant; his mother was the daughter of a German immigrant and nurtured Blumenthal's interest in books and reading. Educated in the public schools, he enrolled in Cornell University, but he left his sophomore year to enlist in the military, as did many of his classmates, when the United States entered World War I in 1917. He joined a Naval aviation unit, but he later recalled that his military service was uneventful.

== Early career and founding of Spiral Press ==
Blumenthal initially followed his father into a sales career, but his love for books soon led him to seek a different type of job. His business experience would still prove useful as he began to work in printing and publishing. In 1924, he took a position with B. W. Huebsch, known for publishing authors such as James Joyce who were controversial at the time, and there Blumenthal quickly began to educate himself in the world of specialized publishing and fine printing.

On sales trips, Blumenthal was first exposed to the work of fine printers and book designers including Bruce Rogers, Daniel Berkeley Updike, and the Nonesuch Press. Blumenthal, aware that he had not completed college, then went to Europe in 1925-26 to embark on a program of self-education in the history of books as well as the contemporary fine-press movement. To continue his informal education, Blumenthal subsequently found apprentice-type jobs in the print shops of William Edwin Rudge and Hal Marchbanks.

At the Marchbanks Press, Blumenthal teamed up with George Hoffman to begin operating a private press in their spare time. Their first project was a book of woodcuts and poems by Max Weber called Primitives (1926). These efforts would become the starting point for the Spiral Press.

== Fine printer and typographer ==
Blumenthal soon began thinking about how to turn his after-hours print shop into a viable independent business. As a salesman for Marchbanks, Blumenthal had encountered great difficulty trying to sell fine presswork as opposed to normal presswork because the usual customers for printing saw no advantage to the extra cost. Blumenthal came to believe that there was no set market for fine presses but that customers who believed in craftsmanship would seek it out. Perhaps a better assurance of customers was that the 1920s was a fertile period for book design, with a new generation of craftsmen trained by the pioneers of the book arts movement, which had been sparked in the 1890s by William Morris in reaction to the rise of industrial production. The Spiral Press worked with a variety of clients, including Henry Holt & Co., Random House, Robert Frost, The Limited Editions Club, The Museum of Modern Art, President Franklin Roosevelt, The Metropolitan Museum of Art, and the Pierpont Morgan Library. The press was also known for taking on a range of work: not only the invitations, bookplates, and limited editions expected for a small press but also typography for large trade editions, indicating the expanding interest in well-designed books.

From the start, the Spiral Press found work doing typography, often for large publishers like Henry Holt who ordered designs for dust jackets, title pages, advertising, etc. Printing and composing were sometimes delegated to outside plants that had higher capacity, but for more exclusive jobs, the Spiral Press acquired production equipment such that Blumenthal could attend to every detail of typesetting, ink, paper, and presswork. During the Depression years, Blumenthal further immersed himself in the traditional craft by setting up a hand-press shop.

Blumenthal also used the Depression period to turn his attention to typeface design. After studying calligraphy and the early masters of type design, he created the Emerson typeface, which he describes as follows:

It may not be a versatile, bread-and-butter face; it is perhaps too close to Renaissance classicism, and if time and opportunity had offered, I would have enjoyed a second attempt with a more contemporaneous approach.

Emerson was available through British Monotype, but sales were very low. The typeface did see some use, mainly through the Spiral Press.

== Historian of books ==
Blumenthal was highly knowledgeable about both contemporary and historical printing. A great deal is recorded in Blumenthal’s memoirs of his own career, such as The Spiral Press through Four Decades and Typographic Years, where Blumenthal’s personal anecdotes are accompanied by careful accounts of historical and cultural context. In a more scholarly vein, Blumenthal did extensive research to create library exhibitions of book history, which he documents in Art of the Printed Book and The Printed Book in America.

== Awards and recognition ==
More than fifty of Blumenthal’s book designs were honored as one of the Fifty Books of the Year by the American Institute of Graphic Arts. The AIGA also awarded Blumenthal a medal for craftsmanship in printing in 1952. In 1966, the work of the Spiral Press was honored with a special exhibition at the Morgan Library, which had additional showings throughout Europe.

== Bibliography and works cited ==
- Blumenthal (1966). The Spiral Press through Four Decades. New York: The Pierpont Morgan Library.
- Blumenthal (1973). Art of the Printed Book 1455-1955: Masterpieces of Typography through Five Centuries. New York: The Pierpont Morgan Library.
- Blumenthal (1977). The Printed Book in America. Boston: David R. Godine.
- Blumenthal (1982). Typographic Years: A Printer’s Journey through a Half Century 1925-1975. New York: Frederic C. Beil.
