= Joseph von Blumenthal =

Austrian musician

Joseph von Blumenthal, also known as Joseph de Blumenthal (1 November 1782 – 9 May 1850), was an Austrian violinist and violist, influential pedagogue and composer.

== Biography ==
Joseph von Blumenthal was born in Brussels, the son of Baron Joseph von Blumenthal and Baroness Maria Therese, née Malabreck. His father, who had a job with the Austrian government, took the family to Prague during the Brabant Revolution (1789–1790). The young Blumenthal and his two brothers, Casimir and Léopold, learned to play the violin and studied composition with Abbé Vogler. When Vogler went to Vienna in 1803 to produce his opera Samori, he recommended his students to the director of the Theater an der Wien, and on his testimony, they were accepted into the theatre orchestra, Joseph on viola, his siblings on violin. From 1842 to 1844 Blumenthal was choirmaster at the Piarist Church, Vienna.

During the first two decades of the nineteenth century, Joseph von Blumenthal wrote a great deal of dramatic music, of which a part was attributed to his brothers. He composed music for the stage including an opera and ballet, symphonies, some chamber music and vocal works. Blumenthal also wrote a considerable amount of music for violin: many concert pieces and instructive works, including a Violin Method (published Vienna, 1805) and a treatise on harmonics (published Vienna, 1829).

His brother Casimir von Blumenthal (1787–1849) went on to become music director in Zurich, and Léopold von Blumenthal (born 1790) was a musician employed by a nobleman in Hungary. Both published compositions for violin and various other works.

== Selected works ==
=== Stage ===
- Don Sylvio de Rosalba (Don Sylvio von Rosalva), Opéra romantique (1805); premiere 18 December 1810

=== Vocal ===
- Vater Unser for soprano, alto, tenor, bass, and ensemble (2 violins, 3 cellos, double bass, 2 horns, 2 trumpets, timpani, organ), Op. 90 (1843)

=== Piano ===
- La Source, Caprice, Op. 1
- 2 Sonatines (in C and G) for piano 4-hands, Op. 76 (1837)
- Divertissement pastorale in C for piano 4-hands, Op. 84 (1842)

=== Chamber music ===
- Sérénade tirée de la pantomime "Arlequin dans l'îsle des amazones" for flute (or violin), viola and guitar (c. 1810)
- String Quartet No. 1 in G major, Op. 13
- Grand Quatuor brillanto for flute, violin, viola and cello, Op. 31
- Variations sur un thême de l'opéra "Cendrillon" de Rossini for string quartet, Op. 32
- String Trio (Terzett) No. 1 in F major for 2 violins and cello, Op. 34 (1827)
- String Trio (Terzett) No. 2 in G major for 2 violins and cello, Op. 35 (1827)
- String Trio (Terzett) No. 3 in C major for 2 violins and cello, Op. 36 (1827)
- String Quartet No. 1 in C major, Op. 38
- String Quartet No. 2 in G major, Op. 39
- String Quartet No. 3 in D major, Op. 40
- Divertissement for violin and cello, Op. 41
- Quartett nach beliebten Motiven der Oper "Fra Diavolo" von D. F. E. Auber for string quartet, Op. 54
- Quartett nach beliebten Motiven der Oper "La Straniera" (Die Unbekannte) von V. Bellini for string quartet, Op. 55
- Quartett nach beliebten Motiven der Oper "Anna Bolena" von Donizetti for string quartet, Op. 56
- Fantaisie et variations sur deux thèmes russes in C for horn (or violin, or cello) and piano, Op. 74 (1837)
- Grand caprice in F major for viola solo, Op. 79 (1838)
- 3 Grands duos concertans (in C, D, F) for violin and viola, Op. 81 (1839)
- Quartett nach beliebten Motiven der Oper "I Capuleti e i Montecchi" von Bellini for string quartet
- Quartett nach beliebten Motiven der Oper "Linda di Chamounix" von Donizetti for string quartet (published 1844)
- Quartett nach beliebten Motiven der Oper "Norma" von Bellini for string quartet
- Quartett nach beliebten Motiven der Oper "Zampa" von L. J. F. Hérold for string quartet

Violin music, including pedagogical works

- Divertissement for 2 violins, Op. 11
- Duo No. 1 (in C, G, F) for 2 violins, Op. 18 (1813)
- 3 Duos for 2 violins, Op. 19 (1813)
- Introduction et variations brillantes sur un motif de l'opéra "I Montecchi" for violin and piano, Op. 20
- 100 Pièces instructives et graduées (100 Übungsstücke) for 2 violins, Op. 42 (1829)
- Potpourri sur différens motifs favoris de "La muette de Portici" variés et dialogués for violin and piano, Op. 44 (1830)
- Nouvelle collection de duos progressifs in 4 books for 2 violins, Op. 46 (1830–1831)
- 3 Terzetten zum Gebrauch für öffentliche Musikschulen for 3 violins, Op. 48 (1832)
- 6 Duos faciles et progressifs for 2 violins, Op. 49
- Introduction et variations brillantes sur l'opéra "I Capuleti e i Montecchi" de Bellini for violin and piano, Op. 50
- 3 Duos faciles et progressifs for 2 violins, Op. 61 (1835)
- Bluette musicale, Rondeau brilliant in G for violin and piano, Op. 62 (1835)
- Introduction, variations brillantes et rondo sur un thême de l'opéra "Hans Heiling" de Marschner for violin and piano, Op. 63
- Introduction et variations sur un motif de l'opéra "Chiara di Rosembergh" de L. Ricci for violin accompanied by a second violin (or piano), Op. 64 (1935)
- 24 Études for violin, Op. 68 (1836)
- Bijoux d'emulation, la barcarolle "Io son ricco" de l'opéra "L'elisir d'amore" de Donizetti varié for violin and piano, Op. 69
- Que faire?, Rondeau en forme de valse sur differents motifs favoris de J. Lanner in C major for violin and piano, Op. 69 (1836)
- Dernière pensée musicale de V. Bellini, Variations faciles et brillantes in C major for violin accompanied by violin and cello, Op. 70 (1836)
- 3 Nocturnes for violin solo, Op. 71 (1837)
- Pentachordes temperés à l'usage des commençans, 6 Duos faciles et instructifs for 2 violins, Op. 73 (1837)
- Rondeau brillant in G for violin solo accompanied by a second violin, viola and cello (or piano), Op. 77 (1838)
- 2 Morceaux de Salon for violin and piano, Op. 77 (1838)

1. Romance
2. Air ancien

- Hommage aux jeunes élèves, Introduction et variations sur un thême autrichien in G major for violin accompanied by violin and cello, Op. 78 (1838)
- 6 Grands duos concertans (in E minor, A, F♯ minor, E, F, G minor) for 2 violins, Op. 80 (1839)
- 6 Duos for 2 violins, Op. 82
- 3 Duos concertans (in E♭, D, G minor) for 2 violins, Op. 83 (1841)
- Gage d'amitié, Impromptu sur des thèmes styriens in A for violin and piano, Op. 85 (1842)
- Fruits de l'étude, 3 Duos (in C, D, G) for 2 violins, Op. 86 (1842)
- Mosaïque musicale, Collection agréables et brillantes for violin and piano, Op. 87 (1842)

1. Fantaisie agréable et brillante sur un motif favorite de Donizetti
2. La Romanesca, Air de danse
3. Rondino sur l'opéra "Corrado d'Altamura"

- Élégie sur le décès d'un objet chéri in C♯ minor for violin and piano, Op. 88 (1842)
- 6 Études caractéristiques et récréatives for violin, Op. 89 (1843)
- La Renaissance, Divertissement sur un motif de Righini for violin and piano, Op. 91 (1843)
- Mes adieux à l'adolescence, 3 Duos for 2 violins, Op. 95 (1847)
- 3 Duos (in F, A, B♭) for 2 violins, Op. posthumous (1853)
- 50 Leçons for 2 violins (published 1855)

== Sources ==
- Fétis, François-Joseph (1867). Biographie universelle des musiciens et bibliographie générale de la musique, Tome 1 (Second ed.). Paris: Firmin Didot Frères, Fils, et Cie. p. (in French)
- Constantin von Wurzbach (1856). Biographisches Lexikon des Kaiserthums Oesterreich, Vol. 1, Vienna: L. C. Zamarski. p. 446.
- "Blumenthal, Josef von". In: Österreichisches Biographisches Lexikon 1815–1950 (ÖBL). Vol. 1, Austrian Academy of Sciences, Vienna 1957, p. 94.
