= Robert Blumenthal (microbiologist) =

American microbiologist

Robert M. Blumenthal is an American microbiologist, currently a Distinguished Professor at the University of Toledo.

He completed his undergraduate education at Indiana University in Bloomington and received his Master of Science and PhD in microbiology from the University of Michigan in 1975 and 1977, respectively.
