= Bloemendaal (disambiguation) =

Bloemendaal is a town in the Netherlands

Bloemendaal may also refer to:

- Bloemendaal aan Zee, seaside resort in the Bloemendaal municipality
  - Bloemendaal railway station
  - a HC Bloemendaal, a Bloemendaal field hockey team
- Bloemendaal (residence) a mansion in the United States build in 1894

== People with the surname Bloemendaal ==
- Adèle Bloemendaal (1933–2017), Dutch actress, cabaret performer, and singer
- Mark Bloemendaal, Dutch footballer
- Scott Bloemendaal, Dutch composer
