= A. C. Blumenthal =

- Born: December 29, 1886; San Rafael, California
- Died: July 29, 1957 (aged 70); Beverly Hills Hotel; Beverly Hills, California
- Occupations: Promoter; Real estate
- Spouse: Peggy Fears (m. 1927–1945)

Alfred Cleveland Blumenthal (December 29, 1886 – July 29, 1957) was an American real estate developer, theatrical promoter and husband of actress Peggy Fears. A C Blumenthal was also a speakeasy owner and friend of New York Mayor Jimmy Walker.

Blumenthal was born in San Rafael, California, to German immigrants. On June 19, 1927, he married the actress Peggy Fears and they divorced in 1945. He died on July 29, 1957 in Beverly Hills.
