= William Ivey Long =

American costume designer (born 1947)

William Ivey Long II
- Born: August 30, 1947 (age 79); Raleigh, North Carolina, U.S.
- Education: College of William and Mary (BA); University of North Carolina, Chapel Hill; Yale University (MFA)
- Occupation: Costume designer
- Awards: Tony Award for Best Costume Design; Tony Award for Best Costume Design in a Musical

William Ivey Long II (born August 30, 1947) is an American costume designer for stage and screen. His most notable work includes the Broadway shows The Producers, Hairspray, Nine, Crazy for You, Grey Gardens, Young Frankenstein, Cinderella, Bullets Over Broadway and On the Twentieth Century.

== Biography ==
=== Early life and education ===
Long was born in Raleigh, North Carolina on August 30, 1947, to William Ivey Long Sr., a Winthrop University professor and stage director, and his wife Mary, who was a high school theatre teacher, actress and playwright. His father was the founder of the Winthrop University theatre department. William grew up in Manteo, North Carolina and Rock Hill, South Carolina.

Upon graduation from high school Long attended the College of William and Mary where he studied history and graduated in 1969, after spending many of his high school and undergraduate summers with his family at Manteo, North Carolina, where Mary, William, Robert, and Laura worked for Paul Green's outdoor drama, The Lost Colony. He then attended the University of North Carolina at Chapel Hill to pursue a Ph.D. in art history. At Chapel Hill he met visiting professor Betty Smith who suggested he apply to the design program at Yale University. He left UNC and went to the Yale School of Drama to study set design. It was here that he met Sigourney Weaver (his roommate at the time), Wendy Wasserstein, Meryl Streep, Christopher Durang, and Paul Rudnick, who were all also students at the university. While at Yale he studied under designer Ming Cho Lee, whom he has credited with being a major influence on his work.

=== Career ===
Upon his graduation from Yale in 1975, he moved to New York City where he worked for couturier Charles James as an unpaid apprentice until James's death in 1978. A friend of his from Yale, Karen Schulz, who was the set designer for a Broadway revival of Nikolai Gogol's The Inspector General, suggested that Long be hired to do costume designs for the show. This marked Long's first Broadway production; he has since designed for over 60 Broadway shows.

He has been nominated for eighteen Tony Awards, winning six (for Nine, Crazy for You, The Producers, Hairspray, Grey Gardens, and Cinderella). He has also won the Drama Desk Award for outstanding costume design for Hairspray, The Producers, Guys and Dolls, Lend Me a Tenor, and Nine. Other recent credits include Young Frankenstein, The Ritz, Chicago, and Curtains.

In 2000 Long was chosen by the National Theatre Conference as its "Person of the Year" and was honored with the "Legend of Fashion" Award by the Art Institute of Chicago in 2003. He was inducted into the American Theater Hall of Fame for 2005.

He remains active in many local activities throughout the state of North Carolina including working with Paul Green's The Lost Colony Outdoor Drama in Manteo, North Carolina which he and his family have been a part of since he was a young child. The Cameron Art Museum in Wilmington, North Carolina featured an exhibition of Long's designs titled "Between Taste and Travesty: Costume Designs by William Ivey Long."

"Long's creations have had a tendency to become as much of a celebrity as the people who wear them," wrote Encore Magazine's art columnist, Lauren Hodges. "His pieces are so lively that they seem to have personalities on their own. The movements the costumes were made for seem to reflect in the fabric. Each detail is lovingly stitched for the characters of the stage and speaks of the story itself, giving the viewer a little taste of the spectacle that is Broadway."

Long has also costumed for Siegfried & Roy at the Mirage Hotel, Leonard Bernstein's operas A Quiet Place and Trouble in Tahiti, and ballets at the New York City Ballet for Peter Martins, Paul Taylor and Twyla Tharp.

In June 2012, he was elected Chairman of The American Theatre Wing. He was the first working theatre artist to hold this position since Helen Hayes.

== Sexual assault allegations ==
In an August 2018 BuzzFeed News report, Long was accused of having sexually harassed a props assistant while working on The Lost Colony in 1996. In November 2021, National Public Radio published an article detailing accusations of sexual abuse and predatory behavior against Long. Long was accused of assaulting a costume designer during the summer of 2001, and assaulting another props assistant/actor over multiple summers. A lawsuit against Long and others filed by a production manager for The Lost Colony was settled out of court. "Those accusations [in the lawsuit] included forcing one young man to have sex with another man at Long's direction, while an RIHA board member watched. The same man claimed that Long performed oral sex on him against his wishes, and that Long also tried to make him find 'young boys with whom Mr. Long could engage in homosexual activity.'" Long has denied these allegations. In May 2026, the New York Supreme Court, Appellate Division dismissed the complaint against Long.

== Productions ==
=== Broadway ===
- The Inspector General – 1978
- The 1940's Radio Hour – 1979
- Passione – 1980
- Mass Appeal – 1981
- Nine – 1982
- The Tap Dance Kid – 1983
- Play Memory – 1984
- End of the World – 1984
- Smile – 1986
- Sleight of Hand – 1987
- Mail – 1988
- Eastern Seaboard – 1989
- Lend Me a Tenor – 1989
- Welcome to the Club – 1989
- Six Degrees of Separation – 1990
- The Homecoming – 1991
- Crazy for You – 1992
- Private Lives – 1992
- Guys and Dolls – 1992
- Laughter on the 23rd Floor – 1993
- Picnic – 1994
- Smokey Joe's Cafe – 1995
- Company – 1995
- Big – 1996
- Chicago – 1996
- Steel Pier – 1997
- King David – 1997
- 1776 – 1997
- Cabaret – 1998
- Annie Get Your Gun – 1999
- The Civil War – 1999
- Epic Proportions – 1999
- Swing! – 1999
- Contact – 2000
- The Music Man – 2000
- The Man Who Came to Dinner – 2000
- Seussical – 2000
- The Producers – 2001
- Thou Shalt Not – 2001
- 45 Seconds from Broadway – 2001
- Hairspray – 2002
- Little Shop of Horrors – 2003
- The Boy From Oz – 2003
- Never Gonna Dance – 2003
- Twentieth Century – 2004
- The Frogs – 2004
- La Cage aux Folles – 2004
- A Streetcar Named Desire – 2005
- Sweet Charity – 2005
- The Caine Mutiny Court-Martial – 2006
- Grey Gardens – 2006
- Curtains – 2007
- The Ritz – 2007
- Young Frankenstein – 2007
- Pal Joey – 2008
- 9 to 5 – 2009
- Looped – 2010
- Catch Me If You Can – 2011
- Hugh Jackman: Back on Broadway – 2011
- Don't Dress for Dinner – 2012
- Leap of Faith – 2012
- Drood – 2012
- Cinderella – 2013
- Big Fish – 2013
- Bullets Over Broadway – 2014
- Cabaret – 2014
- On the Twentieth Century – 2015
- It Shoulda Been You – 2015
- Disaster! – 2016
- A Bronx Tale – 2016
- Prince of Broadway – 2017
- Tootsie – 2019
- Beetlejuice – 2019
- Diana – 2021

=== Off Broadway ===
- Two Small Bodies
- Conjuring an Event
- The Vienna Notes
- Mass Appeal
- Passione
- True West
- Hunting Scenes from Lower Bavaria
- Sister Mary Ignatius Explains It All for You
- The Actor's Nightmare
- Twelve Dreams
- Poor Little Lambs
- American Passion
- The Lady and the Clarinet
- Hey, Ma...Kaye Ballard
- After the Fall
- The Marriage of Bette and Boo
- Hamlet
- Principia Scriptoriae
- Wenceslas Square
- Italian American Reconciliation
- Eleemosynary
- Assassins
- The Food Chain
- Splendora
- Tovah: Out of Her Mind
- The Mystery of Irma Vep
- La Terrasse
- Contact
- Godspell
- The Syringa Tree
- A Bad Friend
- Valhalla
- Grey Gardens
- Princesses
- Canned Ham
- The School for Lies
- Lucky Guy
- The Belle of Amherst

=== Touring productions ===
- Dreamgirls

=== Film ===
- Life with Mikey – 1993
- The Cutting Edge – 1992
- Curtain Call – 1999
- Chop Suey – 2001
- The Producers – 2005

=== Television ===
- Ask Me Again – 1989
- Crazy for You – 1999
- The Man Who Came to Dinner – 2000
- Grease: Live – 2016
- The Rocky Horror Picture Show: Let's Do the Time Warp Again – 2016
- A Christmas Story Live! – 2017
