= Peter Bartlett (actor) =

American actor

- Occupation: Actor
- Years active: 1964–present

Peter Bartlett is an American actor.

== Career ==
With appearances on shows such as Law & Order and films such as Meet the Parents, Bartlett portrayed Nigel Bartholomew-Smythe on the ABC soap opera, One Life to Live. He had portrayed this role from 1991 until the soap's cancellation in 2012. In 2009, he began portraying Nigel's English cousin Neville. In 2004 he appeared on Broadway playing the role of Pluto in The Frogs, the Stephen Sondheim-Burt Shevelove-Nathan Lane adaptation which played at the Vivian Beaumont Theater at Lincoln Center. His lively performance was well received by critics and audiences, and Stephen Sondheim has stated that Mr. Bartlett's delivery of the line, "Get out of town!" (preserved on the original cast recording by PS Classics) was a highlight of the show. He also starred in the 2009 Disney film The Princess and the Frog as a valet named Lawrence. He starred on Broadway in The Drowsy Chaperone as Underling, the butler. He opened to highly favorable reviews in the Broadway revival of Rodgers and Hammerstein's Cinderella on March 3, 2013, playing the Prince's calculating Regent, Sebastian. He later played several roles in the hit Broadway musical Something Rotten!, and appeared as the flabbergasted "Head Waiter" in the Roundabout revival of She Loves Me in 2016.

Since 1993, the openly gay Bartlett has been frequently associated with the plays of gay playwright Paul Rudnick, beginning with the latter's Off-Broadway success Jeffrey in circa 1993–1994 and continuing through The Most Fabulous Story Ever Told (1998) and The Naked Truth (1994).

== Credits ==
=== Theatre ===
Source: Internet Broadway Database

Year	Show	Role	Notes
1969	A Patriot for Me	Shepherdess/Hofburg Guest/Officer/Boy (u/s)/Lady of Fashion (u/s)/Ferdy (u/s)/Marie Antoinette (u/s)	Oct. 6 – Nov. 15, 1969
1970	Gloria and Esperanza	Ensemble	Feb. 4–14, 1970
1973	Boom Boom Room	Guy	Nov. 8 – Dec. 9, 1973
1975	I Remember the House Where I Was Born		May 15–18, 1975
1977	The Crazy Locomotive	Valery Bean	Feb. 4–13, 1977
1989	Buzzsaw Berkeley	Mr. Krupps/James Looney/Zack Fleece/Ace	Opened Aug. 1, 1989
1991	The Learned Ladies	Vadius/Judge	Feb. 26 – Apr. 7, 1991
1992	Jeffrey	Sterling/Man in Bed	Dec. 31, 1992 – Jan. 16, 1994 (Replacement)
1994	The Naked Truth	Dan Barstow/Messenger/Fr. Middlebury	May 26 – Jul. 10, 1994
1995	Don Juan in Chicago	Mephistopheles	Mar. 3 – Apr. 9, 1995
1998	The Most Fabulous Story Ever Told	Shreve Pomfret/Peter/Dad #1/Pharoh/Trey Pomfret	Dec. 1, 1998 – May 2, 1999
1999	Voices in the Dark	Hack	Aug. 12 – Oct. 10, 1999
Late 1990s	Beauty and the Beast	Cogsworth	Replacement
2001	Rude Entertainment	Mr. Charles/Trent/Paul	Sep. 20 – Oct. 21, 2001
2003	Never Gonna Dance	Mr. Pangborn	Dec. 4, 2003 – Feb. 15, 2004
2004	The Frogs	Pluto	Jul. 22 – Oct. 10, 2004
2007	The Drowsy Chaperone	Underling	Jan. 16 – Dec. 30, 2007 (Replacement)
2008	The New Century	Mr. Charles	Mar. 20 – Jun. 8, 2008
2008	What's That Smell: The Music of Jacob Sterling	Leonard	Nov. 1 – Dec. 28, 2008
2010	A Free Man of Color	Count Achille Creux/Mercure	Nov. 18, 2010 – Jan. 9, 2011
2011	The Illusion	Matamore	May 17 – Jul. 17, 2011
2013	Rodgers and Hammerstein's Cinderella	Sebastian	Mar. 3, 2013 – Jan. 3, 2015
2015	Something Rotten!	Lord Clapham/Master of Justice	Apr. 22, 2015 – Mar. 2, 2016
2016	She Loves Me	Head Waiter	Mar. 3 – May 22, 2016
2019	Mrs. Doubtfire	Mr. Jolly	Nov. 26, 2019 – Jan. 4, 2020; Mar. 9–12, 2020; Oct. 21, 2021 – present

=== Film ===
Year	Title	Role	Notes
1995	Jeffrey	Casting Director	
2000	Meet the Parents	Animal Shelter Worker	
2001	Get Well Soon	Louis	
2005	The Producers	Kevin	
2009	The Princess and the Frog	Lawrence (voice)	
2016	She Loves Me	Head Waiter	Filmed production

=== Television ===
Year	Title	Role	Notes
1987	Leg Work	Clerk at Boutique	Episode: "All This and a Gold Card Too"
1991–2013	One Life to Live	Neville Bartholomew-Smythe	Recurring role
1991–2013	One Life to Live	Nigel Bartholomew-Smythe	Recurring role
1994	The Cosby Mysteries	Cigar Store Manager	Episode: "The Fine Art of Murder"
1999	Law & Order	Judge Thomas Orlin	Episode: "Disciple"
2001	Ed	Mr. Dunford	Episode: "Losing Streak"
2001	Law & Order: Criminal Intent	Ferris	Episode: "The Extra Man"
2012	Jack in a Box	Jimmy	Episode: "The Future"
2013	The Big C	Thrift Store Manager	Episode: "You Can't Take It with You"
2023	Only Murders in the Building	Jerry Blau	Episodes: "Ghost Light" & "Opening Night"

=== Video games ===
Year	Title	Role	Notes
2012	Sorcerers of the Magic Kingdom	Lawrence (voice)	

== Awards and nominations ==
Year	Award	Category	Nominee	Result
1999	Drama Desk Award	Outstanding Featured Actor in a Play	The Most Fabulous Story Ever Told	Nominated
