= Edward Hibbert =

American-born British actor (born 1955)

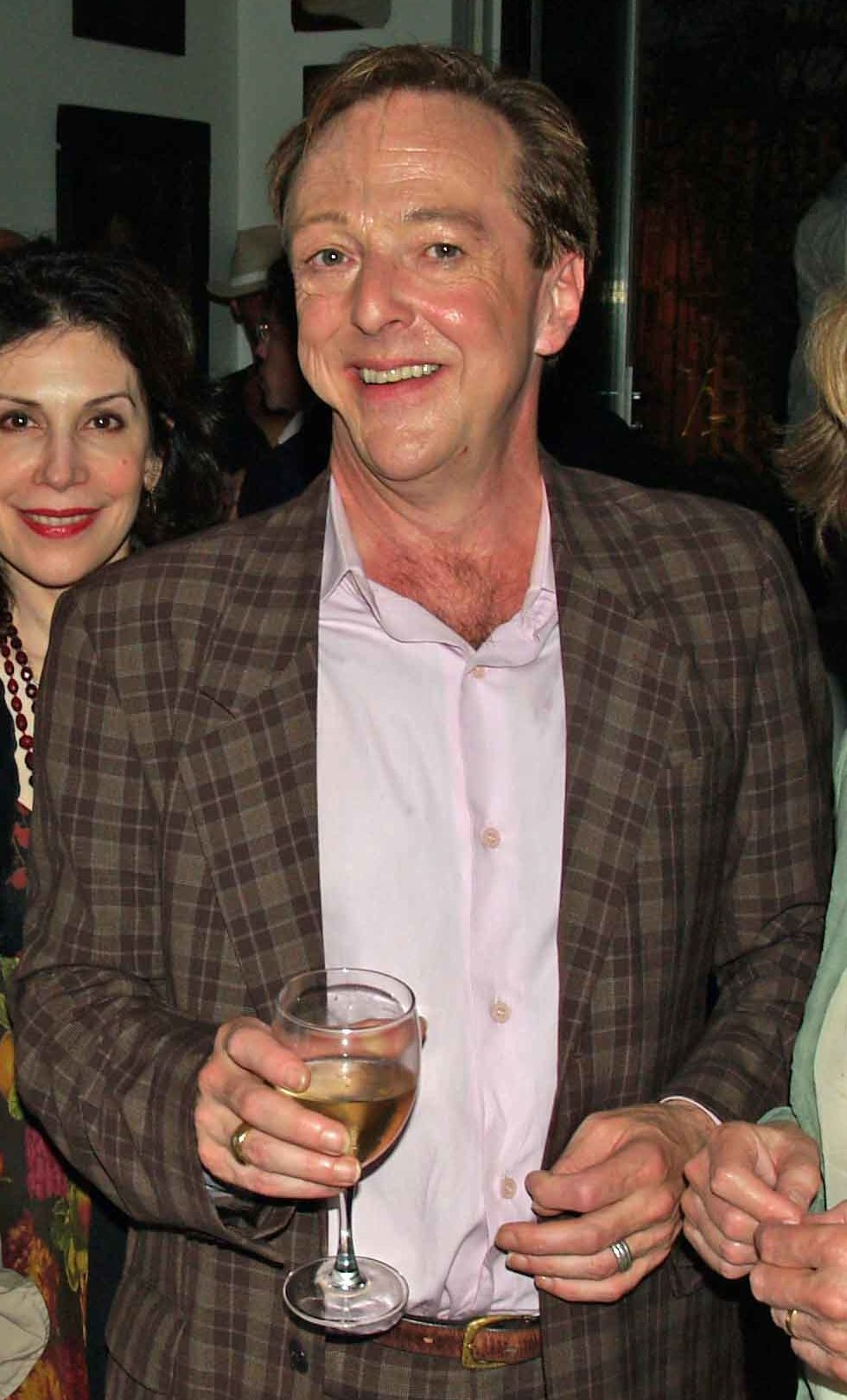
- Hibbert in 2007
- Born: September 9, 1955 (age 70); Long Island, New York, U.S.
- Citizenship: United States; United Kingdom
- Education: Royal Academy of Dramatic Art
- Occupations: Actor; literary agent
- Years active: 1977–present
- Father: Geoffrey Hibbert
- Website: www.edwardhibbert.com

Edward Hibbert (born September 9, 1955) is an American-born British actor and literary agent. He played Gil Chesterton in the TV series Frasier, later reprising the role in 2024. He also voiced Zazu in several instalments in The Lion King franchise, replacing Rowan Atkinson who voiced Zazu in the first movie.

== Early life ==
Hibbert was born on Long Island, New York, the son of English actor Geoffrey Hibbert. He has one sister. He was raised in England, where he attended the Royal Academy of Dramatic Art. He returned to the US in the mid-1980s.

== Career ==
=== Acting career ===
Hibbert had a starring role as Faulconbridge in the BBC's production of The Life and Death of King John, published in 1984. He has appeared on Broadway and in major regional theatre productions, worked in television as a series regular and guest star and also had roles in major films. In 1993 he won an Obie Award for his co-starring role of "Sterling" in Paul Rudnick's Jeffrey. His "Frederick Fellows/Philip Brent" in the National Theatre revival of Noises Off (presented at the Brooks Atkinson Theatre) was called "delightfully discombobulated" by one reviewer. Hibbert was in the Broadway musicals The Drowsy Chaperone and the 2007 premiere of Curtains (which reunited him with his Frasier co-star David Hyde Pierce). He appeared on Broadway as "Mr. Praed" (the architect) in Roundabout Theatre's 2010 production of Mrs. Warren's Profession starring Cherry Jones. He appeared on Broadway in the new musical It Shoulda Been You in 2015, again working with David Hyde Pierce, this time with Pierce as the director. He appeared in the 2019 Hollywood Bowl production of Into the Woods playing the Narrator.

He guest-starred on TV shows including Cosby, Murder, She Wrote and Law & Order: Special Victims Unit but is probably best known for his recurring role on Frasier as Gil Chesterton, KACL's haughty, effeminate restaurant critic.

As a voice actor, Hibbert has been the voice of Evil the Cat on the Earthworm Jim TV series, and the voice of Zazu in Timon & Pumbaa, The Lion King II: Simba's Pride and in The Lion King 1½, replacing Rowan Atkinson, who voiced him in the original film. His appearances in films include The Prestige, Taking Woodstock, and The First Wives Club.

=== Literary work ===
He is also a literary agent and was partner in the now-defunct literary agency Donadio & Olson, Inc. He has authors Chuck Palahniuk, Christopher Bram, Steven DeRosa, and Ed Sikov among his clients and has also represented film rights for Fight Club and Gods and Monsters plus others.

In 2018 it was revealed that Hibbert and his partner, Neil Olson, had ignored complaints from clients about missing or late payments, which ultimately led to the discovery that the accountant under their purview, Darin Webb, had embezzled more than $3 million from clients and estates of authors, including Mario Puzo. The author most affected was bestselling author Chuck Palahniuk, who was nearly bankrupted. While Hibbert maintained he knew nothing at all of this, writers with the agency revealed that they had long voiced concerns about their finances. James Curtis, who was represented by Olson for a number of years and sold four books with the agent (including the Pantheon-published 2015 title William Cameron Menzies), said his initial interaction with the bookkeeper led him to believe he was dealing with a case of negligence. Theft, Curtis said, was not on his radar. He noted that after contacting Webb repeatedly about a check for a "piddly sum of money" that had gone missing, he just assumed "Darin was incompetent." Adding that he "always had problems dealing with Webb," Curtis said he "brought Neil in" but that "Neil had a hands-off" policy in dealing with his bookkeeper.

The Authors Guild has urged clients to continue with litigation against Hibbert and Olson. Neil Olson is working again as an agent with Massie & McQuilkin, but Hibbert has remained out of the literary world.

== Personal life ==
Hibbert is gay. In a 2001 interview, he said that he had not come out to his family, but had not felt it necessary: "I think in England it's not the same. It's unspoken but understood." In a 2014 interview, he said "Being gay for me in Hollywood was not a problem. Someone once said, 'An Englishman and a homosexual is a distinction without a difference.."

== Acting credits ==
=== Film ===
Year	Title	Role	Notes
1982	Britannia Hospital	Theatre Surgeon	
1994	The Paper	Jerry	
1996	Loch Ness	Scientist	Uncredited
1996	The First Wives Club	Maurice	
1996	Everyone Says I Love You	Harry Winston Salesman	
1997	Hudson River Blues	Yago	
1998	The Lion King II: Simba's Pride	Zazu	Voice, direct-to-video
2000	It Had to Be You	Stanley	Uncredited
2001	Friends & Family	Richard Grayson	
2002	Dummy	Unemployed Actor	
2003	Uptown Girls	Christies' Rep	
2004	The Lion King 1½	Zazu	Voice, direct-to-video
2004	Fakers	Gordon Fisher	
2004	A Different Loyalty	Sir Michael Strickland	
2006	The Prestige	Ackerman	
2008	Fall Down a School	Raphael	Voice
2009	I Hope They Serve Beer in Hell	Professor	
2013	Seven Psychopaths	Raphael	Voice
2016	Youth in Oregon	Audubon Expert	Voice
2017	The Wilde Wedding	TV Host	
2018	Mary Poppins Returns	Mary Poppins' Parrot Umbrella	Voice

=== Television ===
Year	Title	Role	Notes
1987	Boon (TV series)	Freight Agent	Episode: "A Fistful of Pesetas"
1991	The Diamond Brothers: South by South East	Sotheby's assistant	Episode: "The Tsar's Feast"
1994	Murder, She Wrote	Philip Jovey	Episode: "Portrait of Death"
1994	Columbo	Bramley Kahn	Episode: "Undercover"
1994–2004	Frasier	Gil Chesterton	Recurring role, 29 episodes
1995	The Nanny	Claude	Episode: "The Chatterbox"
1995	Married... with Children	Dr. Richelieu	Episode: "Love Conquers Al"
1995–1996	Earthworm Jim	Evil the Cat	Voice, 15 episodes
1996–1999	Timon & Pumbaa	Zazu	Voice, 4 episodes
1998–1999	Fantasy Island	Harry	Main role, 13 episodes
2005	Once Upon a Mattress	The Wizard	Television Film
2005	The Muppets' Wizard of Oz	Stage Manager (uncredited)	Television Film
2006	Gilmore Girls	Randall	Episode: "Merry Fisticuffs"
2010	Law & Order: Special Victims Unit	Nigel Prestwick	Episode: "Shadow"
2012	Partners	Lyle	Episode: "Troubled Water"
2013	Ambassadors	Equerry	Episode: "The Prince's Trousers"
2016	2 Broke Girls	Bernard	Episode: "And the Coming Out Party"
2017	Search Party	Bing	Episode: "Paralysis" Episode: "Hysteria"
2019	Grace and Frankie	Laramie	Episode: "The Ceremony"
2019	Blue Bloods	Milton Vance	Episode: "Two-Faced"
2024	Frasier	Gil Chesterton	Episode: "Thank You, Dr. Crane"

=== Theatre ===
Year	Title	Role	Notes
1993	Jeffrey	Sterling / Man No. 5 in Bed	
1994	Lady in the Dark	Russell Paxton / Beekman / Minstrel / Father of the Bride / Ringmaster	Encores!
2001	Noises Off	Freddie Fellowes / Philip Brent	Broadway
2006	The Drowsy Chaperone	Underling	Broadway
2007	Curtains	Christopher Belling	Broadway
2010	Anyone Can Whistle	Comptroller Schub	Encores!
2010	Mrs. Warren's Profession	Mr. Praed	Broadway
2015	It Shoulda Been You	Albert	Broadway
2015–2017	Something Rotten!	Lord Clapham / Master of the Justice	Broadway
2019	Into the Woods	The Narrator	Hollywood Bowl

=== Video games ===
Year	Title	Role	Notes
2011	Star Wars: The Old Republic	Lt. Talos Drellik	Voice role
