= Anti-LGBTQ rhetoric =

Themes, catchphrases, and slogans used to demean LGBTQ people

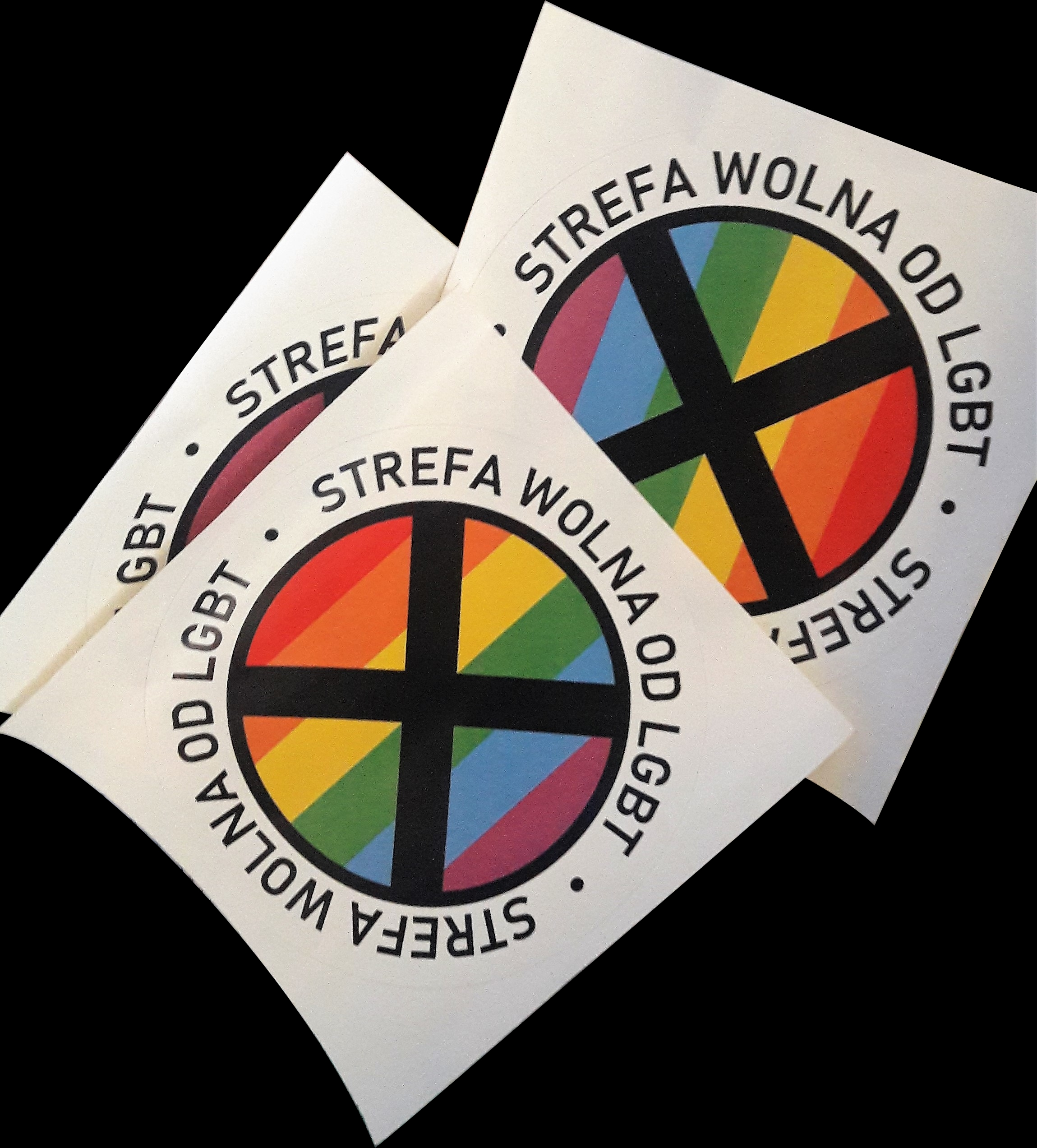
LGBT-free zone stickers distributed by the Gazeta Polska newspaper, 2019

Anti-LGBTQ rhetoric comprises themes, catchphrases, and slogans that have been used in order to demean lesbian, gay, bisexual, transgender, and queer (LGBTQ) people. Anti-LGBTQ rhetoric is widely considered a form of hate speech, which is illegal in countries such as the Netherlands, Canada, Norway, and Sweden.

Anti-LGBTQ rhetoric often consists of moral panic and conspiracy theories. LGBTQ movements and individuals are often portrayed as subversive and foreign, similar to earlier conspiracy theories targeting Jews and communists.

== As a foreign import or conspiracy ==
=== Europe ===
In 1969, the Greek junta exited the Council of Europe after being found in violation of the European Convention on Human Rights, judging that the European Commission of Human Rights was "a conspiracy of homosexuals and communists against Hellenic values".

This discourse, promoted by the governments of Hungary and Poland, alleges that LGBTQ rights movements are controlled by foreign forces (such as the European Union) and are a threat to national independence and Western civilization. Anti-government protests in Russia and the Euromaidan have also been portrayed by the Russian government as the work of an LGBTQ conspiracy. Furthermore, although Russia considers itself to be a European country, its government also considers its values as entirely different from those of the European Union. More specifically, Russia has distanced itself from the values of the EU by propagating its own anti-LGBTQ values.

=== Africa ===
Homosexuality is often viewed as a product of Western culture and un-African. Some historians deny that homosexuality was present in Africa prior to colonialism, though this is false. Post-colonial tensions persist in Africa. Countries which formally colonized Africa are seen as moral leaders advocating for homosexuality. When Western nations get involved with LGBTQ rights in African countries, it can cause strong public reactions.

In 2011, the European Union increased funding for organizations in Cameroon serving gay people, this sparked media backlash in the country. In 2015, an American ambassador in Burkina Faso briefly talked about a drafted anti-homosexuality bill with Chérif Sy, and, the ambassador was subsequently seen as meddling with the country's culture. Speculation brewed as the media discussed what happened, and it assumed that the ambassador was using American aid as a form of blackmail by making it contingent on government support of LGBTQ rights.

Support strategies from Western countries can easily backfire if handled poorly. Framing the country receiving support as morally inferior and in need of rescue stigmatizes non-Western countries and creates a combative dichotomy of being either pro or anti-LGBTQ. Punitive measures like condemnation, threatening to take away foreign aid, or suspending foreign aid creates backlash that is taken out on LGBTQ people within the country. Western countries are perceived as having double standards by calling out harm done to LGBTQ people in some countries but not others depending on what is politically advantageous. Even when punitive interventions succeed, they further solidify the idea that LGBTQ rights are impositions by Western countries.

Western influence is not always pro-LGBTQ. For instance, the African Inter-Parliamentary Conference on Family Values and Sovereignty invites conversative figures from the United States and Europe. The Institute for Journalism and Social Change, an American Christian-rights group with a history of anti-gender campaigning, spent 5.2 million dollars in Africa in 2022. In 2023, United States representative Tim Walberg gave a speech imploring Uganda to remain steadfast with its anti-LGBTQ legislation.

== As an ideology ==
In 2013, the conservative blog American Thinker published several articles using the phrase "LGBT ideology". The Italian Catholic philosopher Roberto Marchesini used the phrase in a 2015 article, equating it with the earlier concept of "gender ideology". In his article, he does not define either "LGBT ideology" or "gender ideology". In 2017, several conservative Islamic politicians in Malaysia and Indonesia denounced "LGBT ideology".

During a sermon on 1 August 2019, Polish Archbishop Marek Jędraszewski called "LGBT ideology" a "rainbow plague" and compared it to the "Red Plague" of Communism. Following this, the Czech cardinal Dominik Duka also commented on "LGBT ideology". However, because Czech society is secular and the Catholic Church has little influence on Czech politics, his comments had little impact. In September 2019, Stanley Bill, a lecturer at Cambridge University who studies Poland, stated "Scaremongering about 'LGBT ideology' has almost become official policy in Poland with often nasty insinuations from members of the government and public media now the norm".

In June 2020, Polish President Andrzej Duda drew international attention when he called LGBTQ an "ideology" and a form of "Neo-Bolshevism". Agreement Party MP Jacek Żalek stated in an interview that the LGBT community "are not people" and "it's an ideology", which led to the journalist Katarzyna Kolenda-Zaleska asking him to leave the studio; the row caused controversy. The next day, Duda said at a rally in Silesia: "They are trying to convince us that [LGBT] is people, but it is just an ideology." He promised to "ban the propagation of LGBT ideology in public institutions", including schools, similar to the Russian gay propaganda law. On the same day, PiS MP Przemysław Czarnek said on a TVP Info talk show, regarding a photo of a naked person in a gay bar, "Let's defend ourselves against LGBT ideology and stop listening to those idiocies about human rights or equality. These people are not equal to normal people."

In July 2020, the European Union announced that it would not provide funding to six Polish towns that have declared themselves "LGBT-free zones", after nearly 100 local governments, a third of Poland's territory, declared themselves "free from LGBT ideology." On 1 August 2020, the anniversary of the Warsaw Uprising, ultranationalist Robert Winnicki compared LGBT to communist and Nazi ideology. He stated, "Every plague passes at some point. The German plague passed, which was consuming Poland for six years, the red plague passed, the rainbow plague is also going to pass."

In August 2020, Justice Minister Zbigniew Ziobro announced a new program for "counteracting crimes related to the violation of freedom of conscience committed under the influence of LGBT ideology". From a government fund intended to help victims of crime, PLN 613,698 was awarded to a foundation to combat the alleged crimes of "LGBT ideology". The project, among other things, explores a supposed connection between LGBT ideology and the Frankfurt School. At the 16 August "Stop LGBT aggression" rally that year, Krzysztof Bosak said that even irreligious people are among opponents of "LGBT ideology" because it is "contrary to common sense and rational thinking". He also said that the LGBT community is "a lower form of social life".

=== Criticism ===
According to Krakow Post, a Polish newspaper, "LGBT is not an ideology [...] The phrase 'LGBT ideology' makes about as much sense as 'redhead ideology' or 'left-handed ideology.'" While the support of many LGBT people and their allies improved LGBT rights, they have differing political views. According to Notes from Poland, "attacks on 'LGBT ideology' – which often rely on exaggerated, distorted or invented claims – result in the marginalisation and demonisation of such people." Center-right presidential candidate Szymon Hołownia, who is a practicing Catholic, stated, "there is no such thing as LGBT ideology, there are [LGBT] people". He said that anti-LGBT rhetoric from politicians could lead vulnerable people to suicide. In protest at the comments made by the president and Żalek, LGBT people have held pickets in various towns and cities in Poland, opposing the idea that LGBT is an ideology. Activists also created a film, "Ludzie, nie ideologia" (People, not ideology), showcasing the families of LGBT people.

An article in OKO.press compared the anti-LGBT campaign to the 1968 "anti-Zionist" campaign: the anti-Zionist campaign ostensibly targeted Zionism as an ideology, but actually targeted Jews as people. Many Jews were forced out of the country in 1968, and many LGBT people have been pressured to emigrate from Poland in 2020. According to Polish historian Adam Leszczyński, "LGBT ideology" is

a bag into which the right wing throws societal changes that do not suit it (eg. calls for equal rights for same-sex couples, which have been implemented in many countries, from the United States to South Africa). In the language of right-wing propaganda [...] 'LGBT ideology' serves to dehumanize minorities and create an enemy – and thus build political support for the right, which presents itself as the only defender of the traditional family, religion and social order. 'Ideology' also fits the right-wing perception of the world in terms of a conspiracy – ideology is 'promoted', someone disseminates it, someone is 'behind it' (eg. George Soros, a Jewish-American financier who supports, among others, LGBT organizations).

== Dehumanization ==
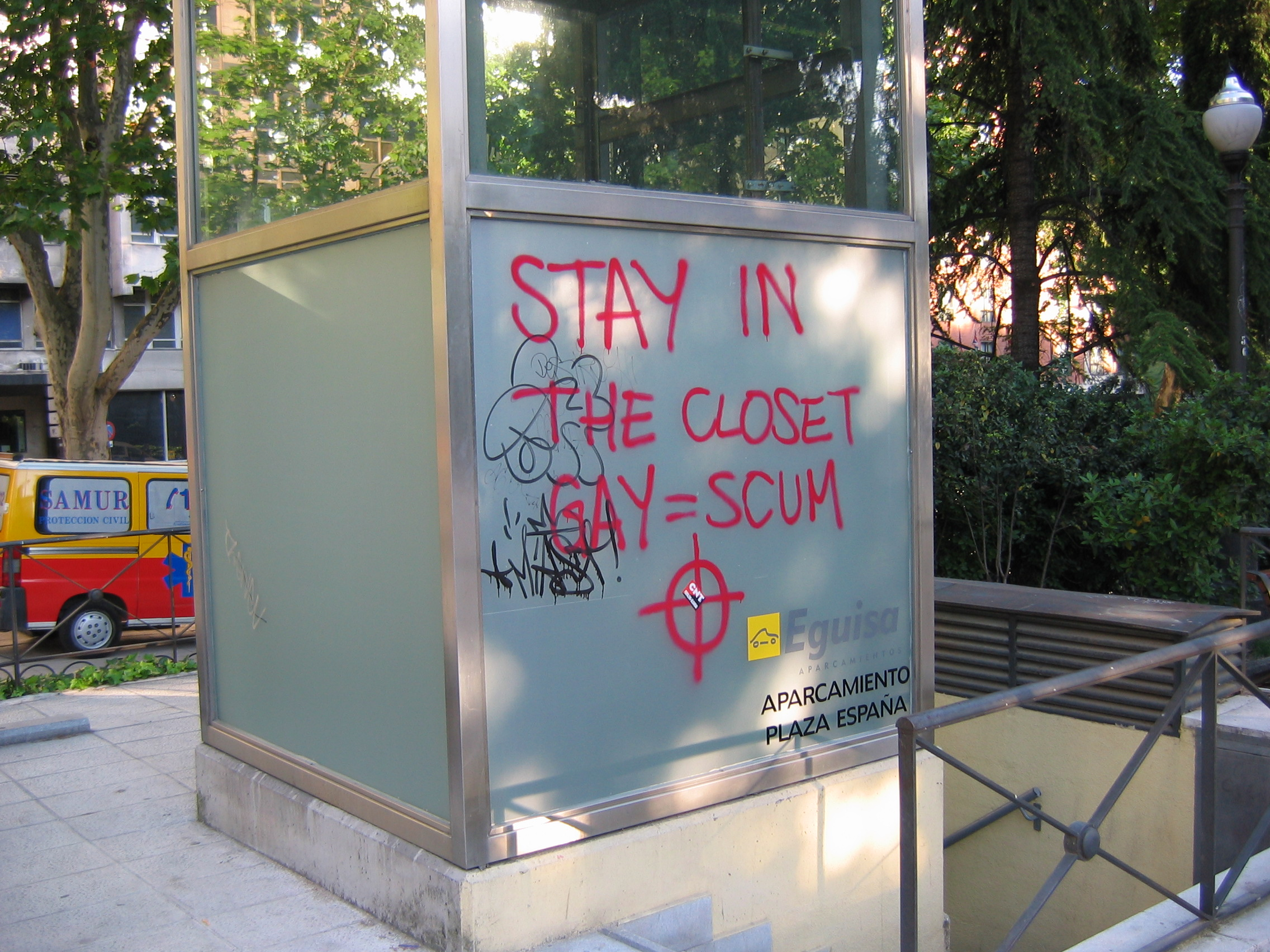
"Stay in the closet; gay=scum": graffiti in Madrid, Spain, followed by a neo-Nazi Celtic cross symbol

Dehumanization is a frequent feature of anti-LGBT rhetoric, which may take the form of comparing LGBT people to animals or equating homosexual relationships with bestiality.

In 2025, the social media conglomerate Meta updated its hate speech policies to allow "allegations of mental illness or abnormality" based on sexual orientation or gender identity, which the LGBTQ magazine The Advocate said would allow "hateful and dehumanizing rhetoric" on Meta's platforms such as Facebook and Instagram.

== Slurs ==
According to one study, "homophobic epithets foster dehumanization and avoidance of gay people, in ways that other insults or labels do not." Another study found that homophobia "results in substantial health and welfare effects".

== Calls for violence ==
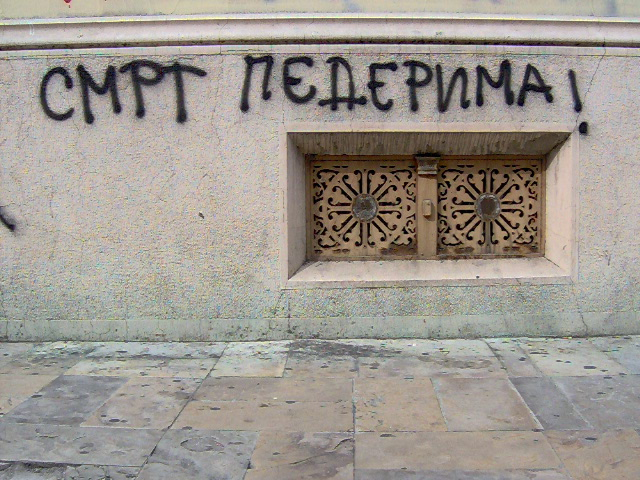
"Death to faggots!": Serbian graffiti in Belgrade

Anti-LGBT rhetoric also includes calls for violence against LGBT people and suggestions that they should be killed or die, such as in Cyprus, Iran, Russia, the United States, Malawi, and Uganda.

In Serbia, members of Obraz chanted "Death to faggots" (Serbian: Смрт педерима). They posted posters stating "we are waiting for you" (Serbian: чекамо вас) next to an image of a baseball bat. In 2012, the organization was banned by the Constitutional Court of Serbia due to extremism.

== Anti-gay themes ==
Anti-gay activists claim that homosexuality goes against traditional family values, that homosexuality is a Trojan Horse, or that it destroys families and humankind through homosexual recruitment which will lead to the extinction of humanity.

=== Homosexuality as a cause of disasters ===
The argument that homosexuals cause natural disasters has been around for more than a thousand years, even before Justinian blamed earthquakes on "unchecked homosexual behavior" in the sixth century. This trope was common in early modern Christian literature; homosexuals were blamed for earthquakes, floods, famines, plagues, invasions of Saracens, and field mice. This discourse was revived by Anita Bryant in 1976 when she blamed homosexuals for droughts in California. In the U.S., right-wing religious groups including the Westboro Baptist Church continue to claim that homosexuals are responsible for disasters. Homosexuals have been blamed for hurricanes, including Isaac, Katrina, and Sandy. In 2020, various religious figures including Israeli rabbi Meir Mazuz have argued that the COVID-19 pandemic is divine retribution for same-sex activity or pride parades.

Following the September 2001 attacks, televangelist Jerry Falwell blamed "the pagans, and the abortionists, and the feminists, and the gays and the lesbians who are actively trying to make that an alternative lifestyle, the ACLU, People for the American Way" for provoking the aggression of Islamic fundamentalists and causing God to withdraw his protection for America. On the broadcast of the Christian television program The 700 Club, Falwell said, "You helped this happen". He later apologized and said, "I would never blame any human being except the terrorists".

In 2012, Chilean politician Ignacio Urrutia claimed that allowing homosexuals to serve in the Chilean military would cause Perú and Bolivia to invade and destroy his country.

=== AIDS as punishment ===
An outgrowth of the discourse on homosexuality causing disasters argues that HIV/AIDS is divine punishment for homosexuality. During the early years of the AIDS epidemic in the 1980s, mainstream newspapers labeled it a "gay plague". For a few years, the misleading technical name for the disease was gay-related immune deficiency.

The slogan "AIDS Kills Fags Dead" (a pun on the commercial slogan for Raid insecticide "Raid Kills Bugs Dead") appeared during the early years of AIDS in the United States, when the disease was mainly diagnosed among male homosexuals and was almost invariably fatal. The slogan caught on quickly as a catchy truism, a chant, or simply something written as graffiti. It is reported that the slogan first appeared in public in the early 1990s, when Sebastian Bach, the former lead singer of the heavy metal band Skid Row, wore it on a t-shirt thrown to him by an audience member. The slogan "AIDS cures fags" is used by the Westboro Baptist Church.

During an anti-gay neo-Nazi rally in the German city of Görlitz in 2024, participants chanted "HIV, hilf uns doch, Schwule gibt es immer noch" ("HIV, help us, there are still gays").

=== Homosexuality as unnatural ===
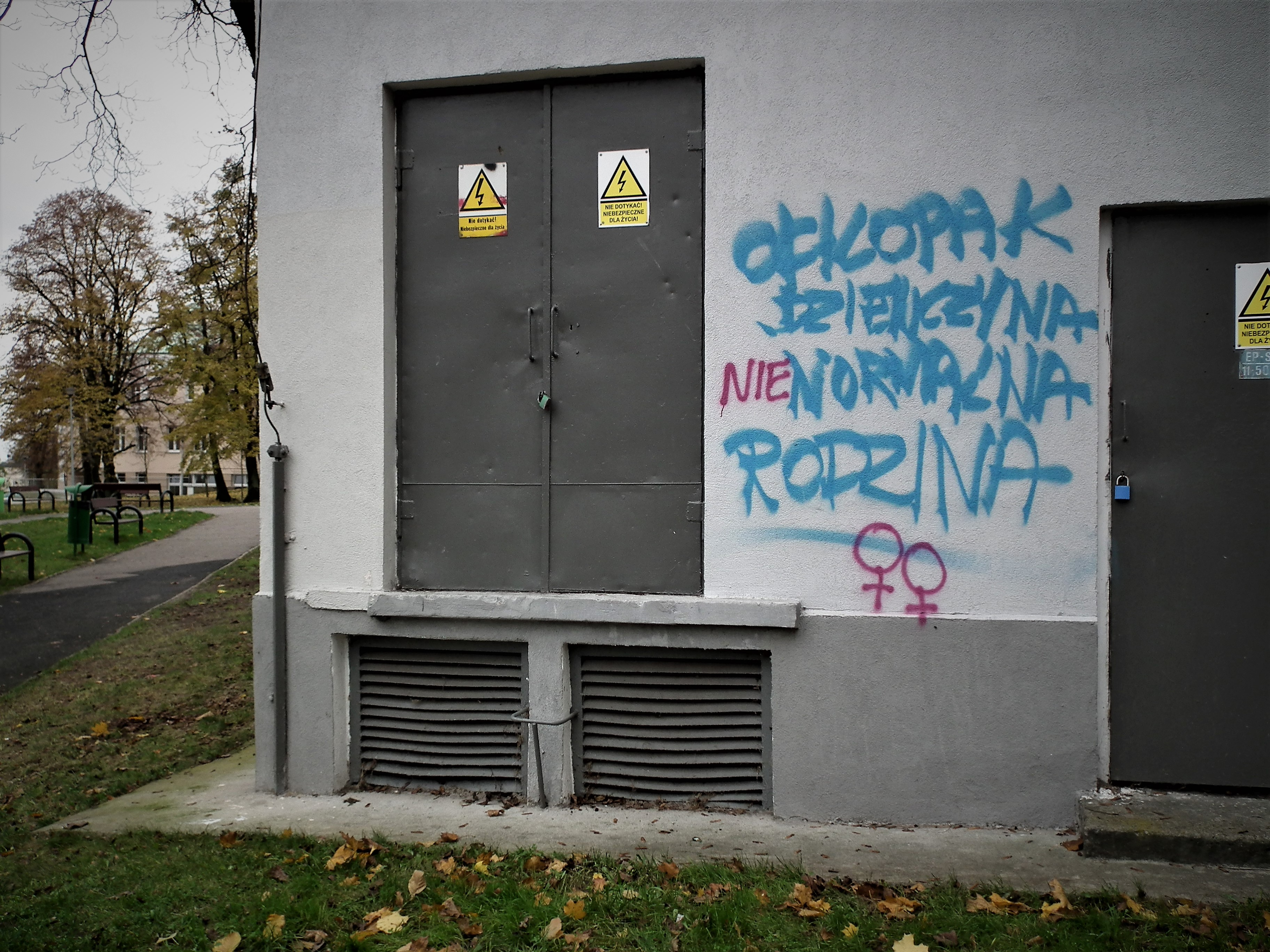
Graffiti in Poznań, Poland: "Boy–girl is the normal family". This has, in turn, been graffitied to add the word "not" in Polish, and two female symbols.

Describing homosexuality as unnatural dates back to Plato, Aristotle, and Thomas Aquinas. However, there is no single definition of "unnatural". Some of those who argue that homosexuality is unnatural in the sense of being absent from nature, an argument refuted by the presence of homosexuality in animals. Others mean that the genitals were created for reproduction (either by God or natural selection) and are not intended to be used for purposes they deem "unnatural". Proponents of this idea often argue that homosexuality is immoral because it is unnatural, but opponents argue that this argument makes an is–ought conflation. Some proponents of the "unnaturalness" thesis argue that homosexual behavior is the result of "recruitment" or willful sinfulness.

=== Homosexuality as a disease ===
Nazi propaganda described homosexuality as a contagious disease but not in the medical sense. Rather, homosexuality was a disease of the Volkskörper (national body), a metaphor for the desired national or racial community (Volksgemeinschaft). According to Nazi ideology, individuals' lives were to be subordinated to the Volkskörper like cells in the human body. Homosexuality was seen as a virus or cancer in the Volkskörper because it was seen as a threat to the German nation. The SS newspaper Das Schwarze Korps argued that 40,000 homosexuals were capable of "poisoning" two million men if left to roam free.

Some of those who called homosexuality unnatural, such as Traditional Values Coalition head and Christian right activist Louis Sheldon, said that if it were proven to be a biologically based phenomenon, it would still be diseased. The psychiatric establishment in the west once medicalized same-sex desire. In the United States, homosexuality was removed in 1973 as a mental disorder from the Diagnostic and Statistical Manual of Mental Disorders (DSM) as it did not meet the criteria for a mental disorder. The Catholic Church still officially teaches that "homosexual tendencies" are "objectively disordered". In 2016, anti-LGBT rhetoric was increasing in Indonesia under the Twitter hashtag #TolakLGBT (#RejectLGBT), stating that LGBT is a disease. In 2019, Archbishop Marek Jędraszewski said that a "rainbow plague" was threatening Poland. In 2020, the education minister defended an official who warned that "LGBT virus" was threatening Polish schools, and was more dangerous than COVID-19.

=== Homosexuality as a choice or lifestyle ===
Along with the idea of "homosexual recruitment", the idea of a "gay lifestyle" or "homosexual lifestyle" is used by social and religious conservatives in the United States to argue that non-heterosexual sexual orientations are consciously chosen. However, scientists favor biological explanations for sexual orientation, arguing that people typically feel no sense of control over their sexual orientation or attractions. The term "gay lifestyle" may also be used disparagingly for a series of stereotyped behaviours.

Christian right activists may worry that increasing LGBT rights will make the "gay lifestyle" more attractive to young people. US media in the 1970s frequently used the term "alternative lifestyle" as a euphemism for homosexuality. The term was employed in an anti-gay context by opponents of the Equal Rights Amendment, as well as supporters of California's Proposition 6, which would have barred openly gay teachers in public schools. In 1977, while campaigning against a local ordinance protecting gay teachers against employment discrimination, anti-gay activist Anita Bryant stated, "A homosexual is not born, they are made". US president Ronald Reagan described the gay rights movement in opposition to American culture, saying the movement was "asking for a recognition and acceptance of an alternative lifestyle which I do not believe society can condone".

=== Homosexuality as sinful or ungodly ===
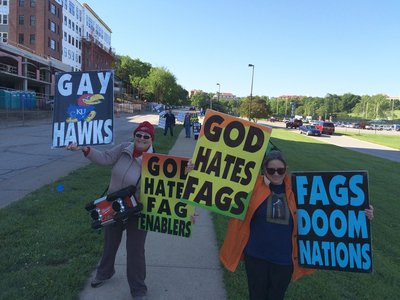
Members of the Westboro Baptist Church picketing at the University of Kansas

Many conservative Christians consider homosexual acts to be inherently sinful based on common interpretations of scriptural passages such as Leviticus 18:22 ("You shall not lie with a male as with a woman; it is an abomination"), Leviticus 20:13 ("If a man lies with a male as with a woman, both of them have committed an abomination; they shall be put to death, their blood is upon them"), and 1 Corinthians 6:9–10 ("Do you not know that wrongdoers will not inherit the kingdom of God? Do not be deceived! Fornicators, idolaters, adulterers, male prostitutes, sodomites, thieves, the greedy, drunkards, revilers, robbers—none of these will inherit the kingdom of God.") The story of Sodom and Gomorrah, two biblical cities which were burned down due to the sins of their inhabitants, is mostly portrayed as divine retribution for homosexual behavior.

Various inflammatory and controversial slogans have been used by opponent congregations and individuals, particularly by Fred Phelps, founder of the Westboro Baptist Church. These slogans have included "God Hates Fags", "Fear God Not Fags", and "Matthew Shepard Burns In Hell".

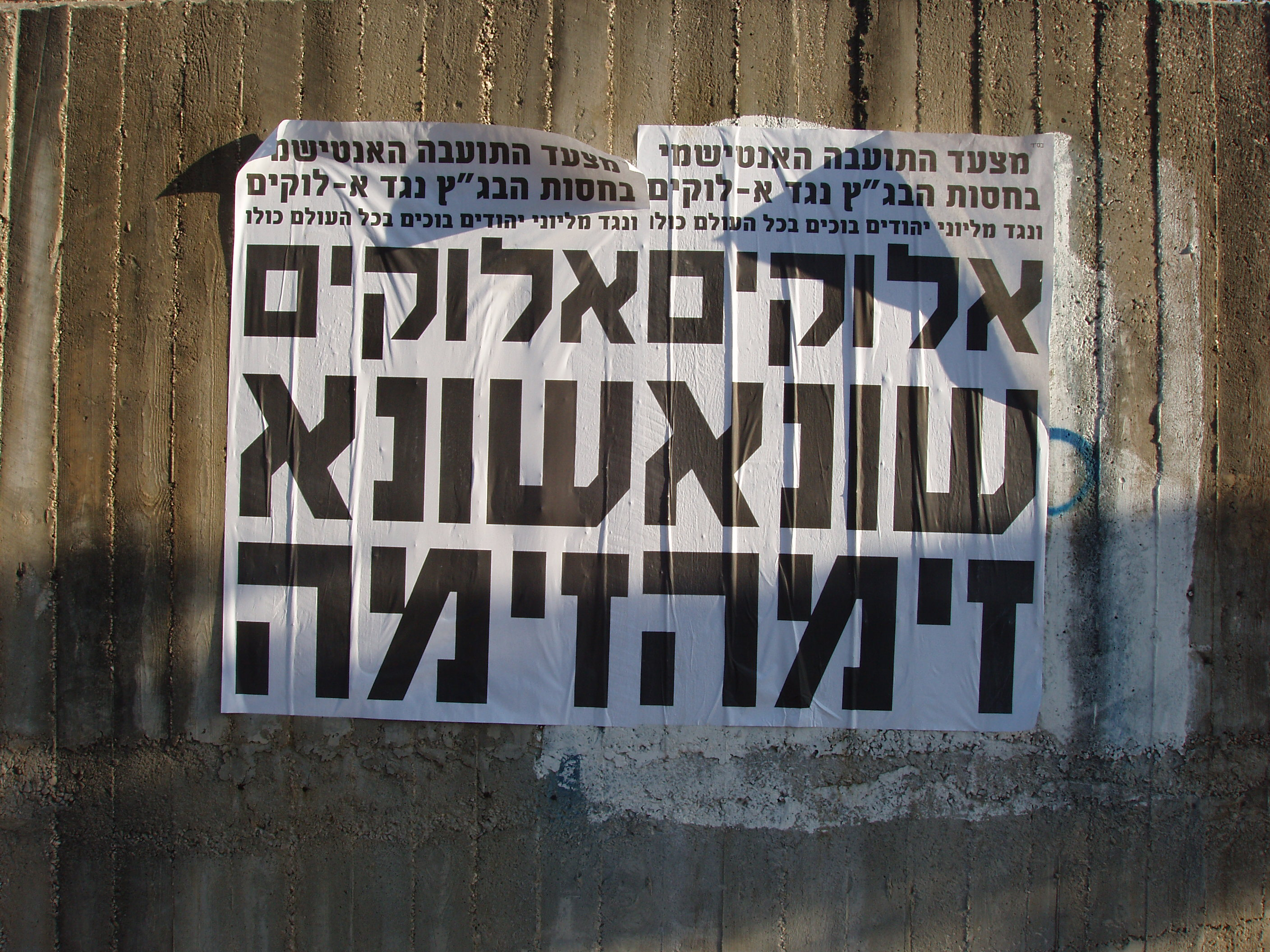
Posters in Tel Aviv prior to the city's Pride Parade: "God hates lechery"

Homosexuality is also frequently considered sinful in Islam. In some Middle Eastern countries, acts of homosexuality are punishable by death. Anti-LGBT rhetoric and political homophobia are growing in some Muslim countries.

Other religious leaders, including Christians, Muslims, and Jews, have denounced anti-LGBT rhetoric.

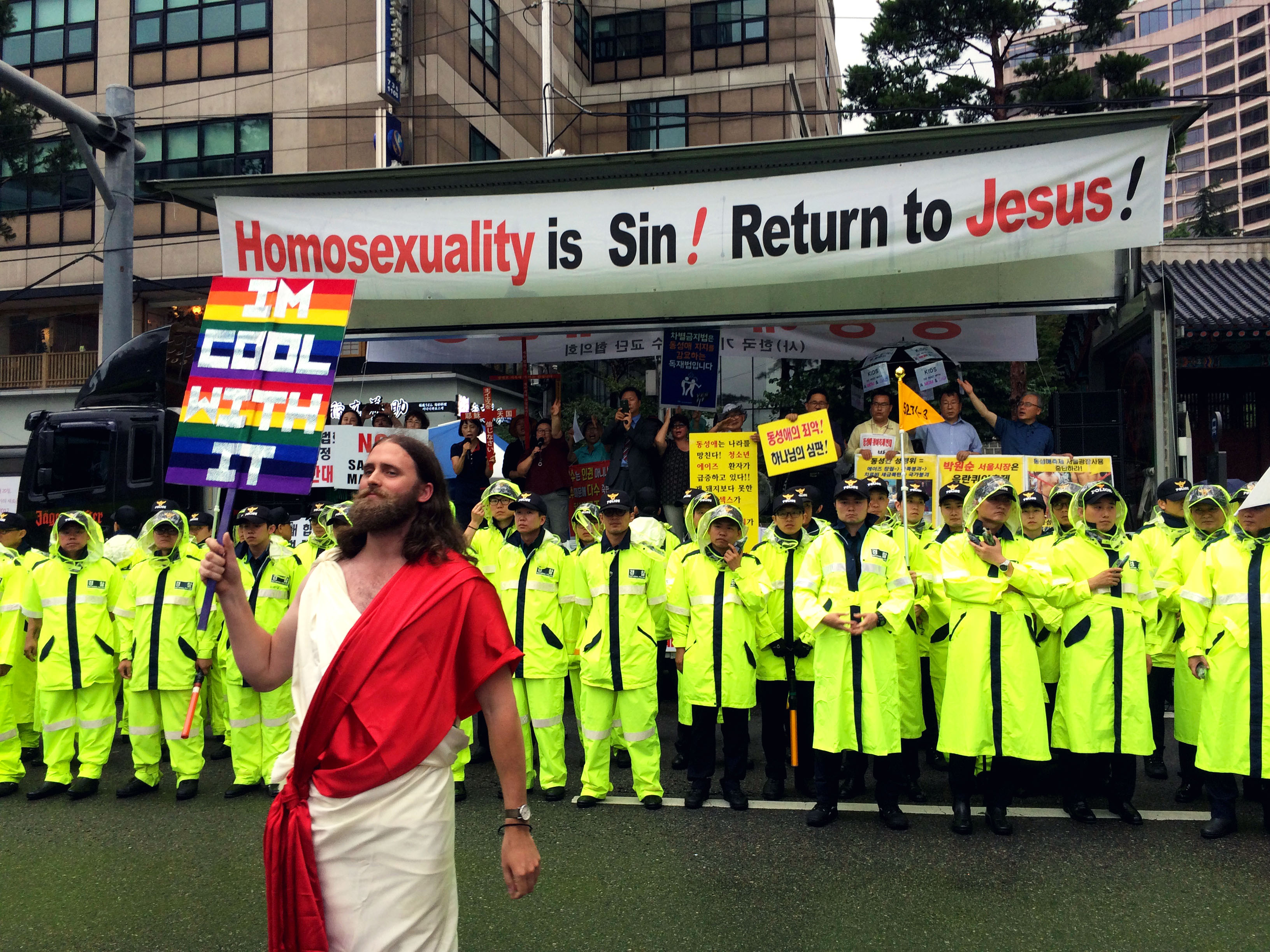
Counter-protester at an anti-LGBTQ demonstration in Seoul, 2017

The slogan "God made Adam and Eve, not Adam and Steve" alludes to a Bible-based argument that homosexuality is sinful and unnatural. A 1970 editorial in Christianity Today quoted a graffito in San Francisco that read, "If God had wanted homosexuals, he would have created Adam and Freddy." In 1977, anti-gay activist Anita Bryant made a similar comment using the phrase "Adam and Bruce". The version with "Adam and Steve" first appeared on a protest sign at a 1977 anti-gay rally in Houston, Texas, featuring Christian right figures such as Phyllis Schlafly and National Right to Life Committee founder Mildred Jefferson. The slogan was also used in "The Gay Bar," a 1977 episode of the sitcom Maude. In 1979, Jerry Falwell used the "Adam and Steve" slogan in a press conference cited in Christianity Today. During the initial outbreak of HIV/AIDS in the United States in 1985, conservative congressman William E. Dannemeyer used the slogan to argue that gay men were a threat to public health.

The phrase later acquired a certain notoriety, and, when used to name a pair of characters in a work of fiction, helps to identify them as members of a homosexual pair (as in Paul Rudnick's play The Most Fabulous Story Ever Told and the 2005 film Adam & Steve). The phrase was used by Democratic Unionist MP David Simpson during a debate on the Marriage (Same Sex Couples) Act 2013 in the British House of Commons, although his slip of the tongue saying "in the Garden of Eden, it was Adam and Steve" initially caused laughter in the chamber. Zimbabwean presidential candidate Nelson Chamisa said in a 2019 interview that "[w]e must be able to respect what God ordained and how we are created as a people, there are a male and a female, there are Adam and Eve, not Adam and Steve". The phrase has been reclaimed by LGBT people and used in blogs, comics, and other media mocking the anti-gay message.

=== Homosexuality as a Western ill ===
Homosexuality is sometimes claimed to be non-existent in some non-Western countries, or to be an evil influence imported from the West.

Prime Minister Mahathir Mohamad of Malaysia employed anti-gay rhetoric as part of his "Asian values" program, describing homosexuality as one of several Western ills. Mohamad used it for political advantage in the 1998 scandal involving the sacking and jailing of MP and former Deputy Prime Minister Anwar Ibrahim by Mohamad amidst accusations of sodomy that the Sydney Morning Herald termed a "blatantly political fix-up". Anwar was subsequently subjected to two trials and sentenced to nine years imprisonment for corruption and sodomy.

While in New York for a meeting of the United Nations, Iranian President Mahmoud Ahmadinejad was invited to speak at Columbia University in New York to give a lecture. When responding to a student's question afterward, he said, speaking through an interpreter: "In Iran, we don't have homosexuals like in your country." In his native Farsi, he used the slang equivalent of faggot, not the neutral term for a "homosexual".

Claims that homosexuality is a Western disease have been observed in Vietnam, China, India, Ethiopia and other African nations, as well as among many Muslims worldwide.

=== Conflation with pedophilia ===
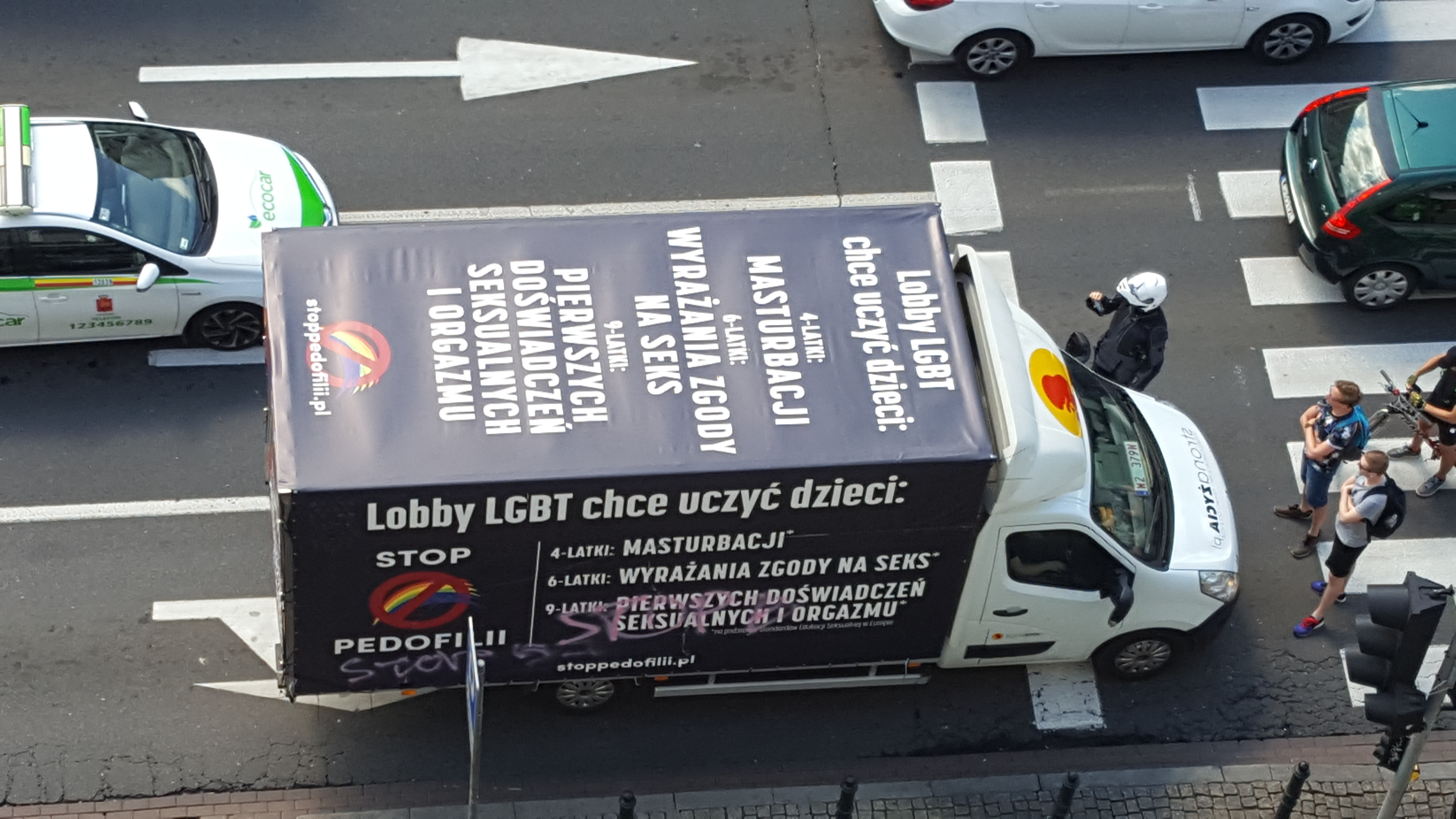
"Stop Pedofilii" van belonging to Fundacja Pro, who claim that pedophilia is advocated by the "LGBT lobby"

The claim that homosexuals sexually abuse children predates the current era, as it was leveled against pederasts even during antiquity. Lawmakers and social commentators have sometimes expressed a concern that normalizing homosexuality would also lead to normalizing pedophilia, if it were determined that pedophilia too were a sexual orientation. A related claim is that LGBT adoption is done for the purpose of grooming children for sexual exploitation. The empirical research shows that sexual orientation does not affect the likelihood that people will abuse children.

Others have made hoaxes intending to falsely associate pedophilia with the LGBT community by rebranding it as a sexual orientation, including claims that the "+" in "LGBT+" refers to "pedophiles, zoophiles, [and] necrophiles", as well as the invented terms "agefluid", "clovergender" (a hoax executed by users of the imageboard 4chan, whose logo is a stylized four-leaf clover), and "pedosexual".

Starting in 2022, some conservatives, including Chaya Raichik of Libs of TikTok, started using the terms "grooming", "groomer" and "pro-pedophile" against their opponents and LGBT people over anti-LGBT legislation, such as laws restricting and banning discussion of sexual orientation and gender identity in schools. Critics say that these usages of the terms diminish the experiences of sexual assault survivors, smear the LGBT community, and are dangerous in general. That same year, after the arrest of William and Zachary Zulock in Walton County, Georgia, United States, right-wing political commentators like Laura Ingraham and Charlie Kirk espoused homophobic views, baselessly linking the crimes committed by the Zulocks to their homosexuality. The rhetoric was replicated by Argentine president Javier Milei in early 2025.

=== "Gay agenda" ===
"Gay agenda" or "homosexual agenda" is a pejorative term for the normalization of non-heterosexual sexual orientations. The term has been used to criticize advocacy for LGBTQ rights, rooted in the belief that LGBTQ activists seek to recruit heterosexuals into a "homosexual lifestyle". The term "gay agenda" originated within the Christian religious right in the United States and has been adopted in nations with active anti-LGBTQ movements, such as in Hungary and Uganda.

=== Recruitment ===
The charge of "homosexual recruitment" is an allegation by social conservatives that LGBT people engage in concerted efforts to indoctrinate children into homosexuality. In the United States, this dates back to the early post-war era. Proponents were found especially among the New Right, as epitomized by Anita Bryant. In her Save Our Children campaign, she promoted a view of homosexuals recruiting youth. A common slogan is "Homosexuals cannot reproduce — so they must recruit" or its variants. Supporters of recruitment allegations point at "deviant" and "prurient" sex education as evidence. They express concern that anti-bullying efforts teach that "homosexuality is normal, and that students shouldn't harass their classmates because they're gay", suggesting recruitment as the primary motivation. Supporters of this myth cite the inability for same-sex couples to reproduce as a motivation for recruitment.

Sociologists and psychologists describe such claims as an anti-gay myth, and a fear-inducing bogeyman. Many critics believe the term promotes the myth of homosexuals as pedophiles:

- In 1977, Anita Bryant successfully campaigned to repeal an ordinance in Miami-Dade County that prohibited discrimination based on sexual orientation. Her campaign was based on allegations of homosexual recruitment. Writing about Bryant's efforts to repeal a Florida anti-discrimination law in the Journal of Social History, Michel Boucai wrote that "Bryant's organization, Save Our Children, framed the law as an endorsement of immorality and a license for 'recruitment'."
- Oregon's proposed 1992 Ballot Measure 9 contained language that would have added anti-LGBT rhetoric to the state Constitution. U.S. writer Judith Reisman justified her support for the measure, citing "a clear avenue for the recruitment of children" by gays and lesbians.
- In a 1998 debate in the British House of Lords on lowering the same-sex age of consent to 16 (equalising it with the opposite-sex age of consent), former Labour cabinet minister Lord Longford opposed the change by stating that "If some elderly, or not so elderly, schoolmaster seduced one of my sons and taught him to be a homosexual, he would ruin him for life." The age of consent was equalised in the UK in 2001.
- A small newspaper in Uganda's capital attracted international attention in 2010 when it outed 100 gay people alongside a banner that said, "Hang them", and claimed that homosexuals aimed to "recruit" Ugandan children, and that schools had "been penetrated by gay activists to recruit kids." According to gay rights activists, many Ugandans were attacked afterward as a result of their real or perceived sexual orientation. Minorities activist David Kato, who was outed in the article and a co-plaintiff in the lawsuit against the paper, was subsequently murdered at home by an intruder and an international outcry resulted.
- In 1998, The Onion parodied the idea of "homosexual recruitment" in an article titled "'98 Homosexual-Recruitment Drive Nearing Goal", saying "Spokespersons for the National Gay & Lesbian Recruitment Task Force announced Monday that more than 288,000 straights have been converted to homosexuality since January 1, 1998, putting the group well on pace to reach its goal of 350,000 conversions by the end of the year." According to Mimi Marinucci, most US adults who support gay rights would recognize the story as satire due to unrealistic details. The Westboro Baptist Church passed along the story as fact, citing it as evidence of a gay conspiracy.

=== Homosexual conspiracies ===
==== "Homintern" ====
During the Cold War, anti-queer commentators in the United States sought to link homosexuality and Communism, using the terms "homintern" and "homosexual mafia" as shorthand for a purported homosexual conspiracy in the arts. "Homintern" is a reference to the "Comintern", the Soviet-sponsored international organization of communist political parties. According to historian Michael S. Sherry, the term was probably used jokingly among artists and writers in England in the 1930s to mock the idea of a powerful cabal of queer artists. Coining of the term has been attributed to various writers, including W. H. Auden, Cyril Connolly, Jocelyn Brooke, Harold Norse, and Maurice Bowra.

Sherry coined the phrase "homintern discourse" to refer to mid-20th-century American conspiracy theories targeting gay artists, many of whose works were prominently used as propaganda in the Cultural Cold War against the Soviet Union. During the second Red Scare in the 1950s, the "homintern" was invoked by American Senator Joseph McCarthy, who used it to claim that the administrations of Franklin D. Roosevelt and Harry S. Truman were set on destroying America from within. According to Sherry, the "homintern discourse" began to decline with the growth of 1960s counterculture and skepticism about the United States' role in the Cold War and Vietnam War.

==== "Gaystapo" ====
The term "Gaystapo" (French: Gestapette) was coined in France in the 1940s by political satirist Jean Galtier-Boissière for the Vichy education minister, Abel Bonnard. It was subsequently applied by National Front leader Jean-Marie Le Pen to Florian Philippot, whom he accused of being a bad influence on Marine Le Pen.

==== "Gay mafia" ====
English theater critic Kenneth Tynan wrote to Playboy editor Auguste Comte Spectorsky in 1967, proposing an article on "The Homosexual Mafia" in the arts. Inspired by this idea, Playboy would subsequently publish a panel discussion on gay issues in April 1971.

The similar term, "velvet mafia," used to describe the influential gay crowd who supposedly ran Hollywood and the fashion industry in the late 1970s, was coined by New York Sunday News writer Steven Gaines in reference to the Robert Stigwood Organization, a British record company and management group.

"Gay mafia" became more widely used in the US media in the 1980s and 1990s, such as the American daily New York Post. The term was also used by the British tabloid The Sun in response to what it claimed was sinister dominance by gay men in the Labour Party Cabinet.

==== "Lavender mafia" ====
While the term "Lavender Mafia" has occasionally been used to refer to informal networks of gay executives in the US entertainment industry, more generally it refers to Church politics. For example, a faction within the leadership and clergy of the Roman Catholic Church that allegedly advocates the acceptance of homosexuality within the Church and its teachings.

==== "Gay lobby" ====
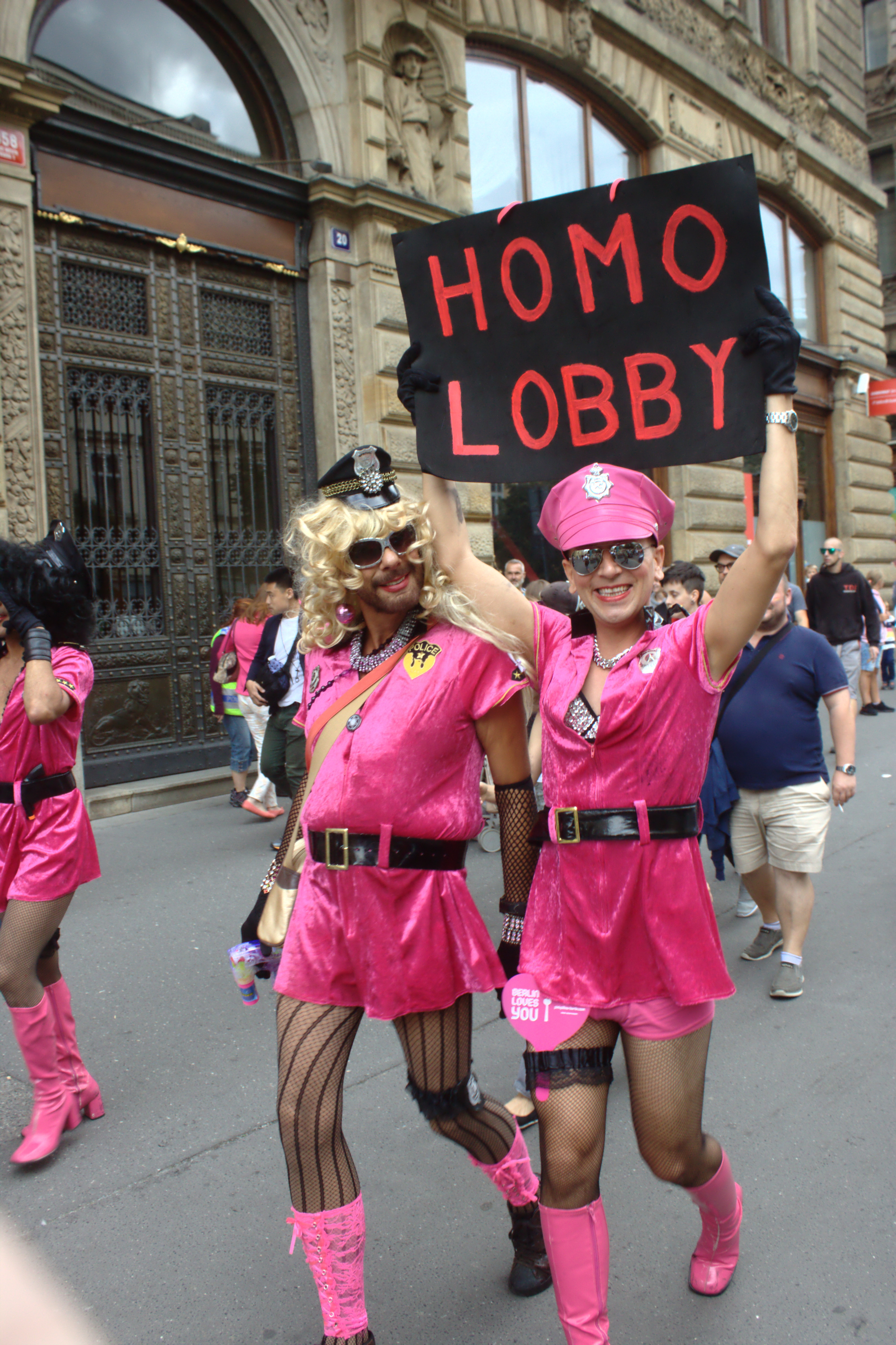
Marchers at Prague Pride 2017 carry a satirical "Homo Lobby" sign, a phrase used as a slur by right-wing populist movements in the Czech Republic.

The term "homo lobby" or "gay lobby" is often used by opponents of LGBT rights in Europe. For example, the Swedish neo-Nazi party Nordic Resistance Movement runs a "crush the homo lobby" campaign. According to the German newspaper Der Tagesspiegel, advocating for LGBT rights could accurately be called lobbying. The term Schwulen-Lobby ('gay lobby') is insulting because it is used to suggest a powerful conspiracy that does not actually exist.

In 2013, Pope Francis spoke about a "gay lobby" within the Vatican, and promised to see what could be done. In July 2013, Francis went on to distinguish the problem of lobbying and the sexual orientation of people: "If a person is gay and seeks God and has good will, who am I to judge?" "The problem", he said, "is not having this orientation. We must be brothers. The problem is lobbying by this orientation, or lobbies of greedy people, political lobbies, Masonic lobbies, so many lobbies. This is the worse problem."

== Anti-transgender rhetoric ==
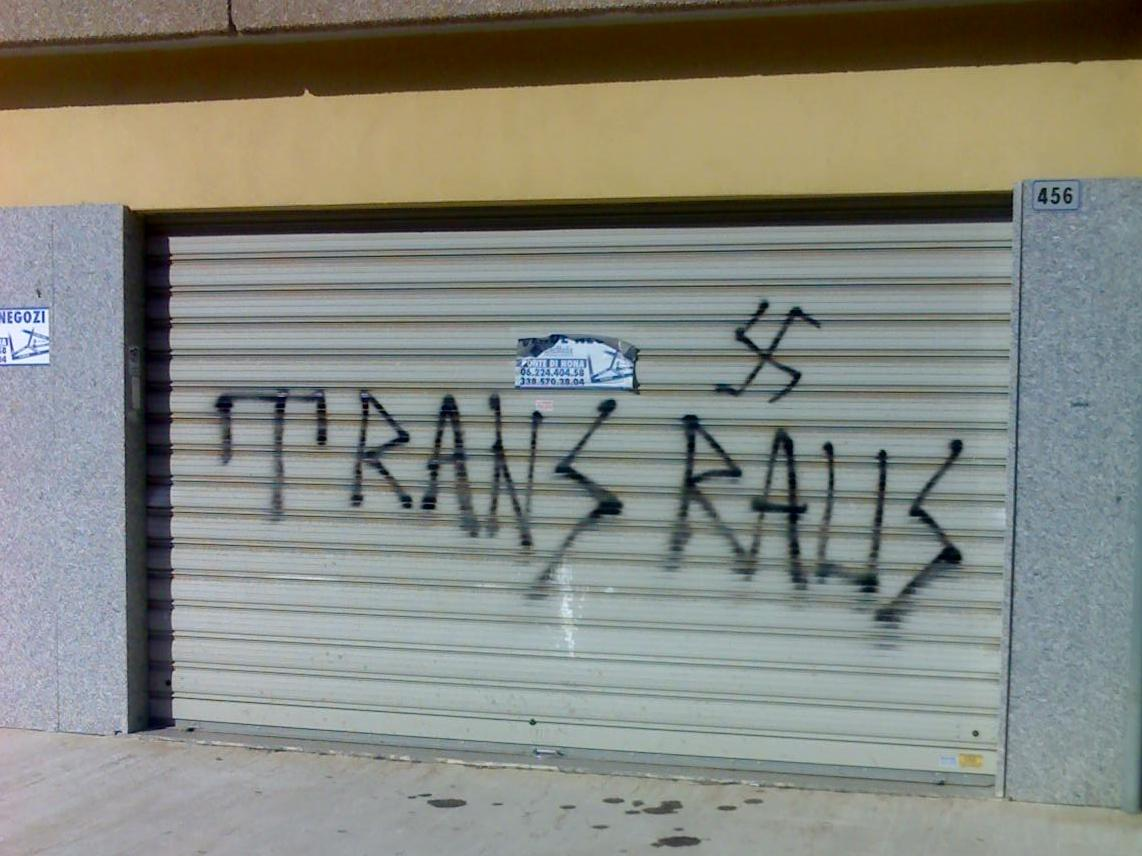
Anti-transgender graffiti in Rome's Municipio VIII district

=== Misgendering ===
Misgendering is the act of labelling others in a way that does not match their gender identity. Misgendering can be deliberate or accidental. It can involve using pronouns to describe someone that are not the ones they use, calling a person "ma'am" or "sir" in contradiction to the person's gender identity, and using a pre-transition name for someone instead of a post-transition one (deadnaming).

=== Deception and pretending ===
There is a fear that people pretend to be transgender or pretend to be the opposite sex. Brunei and Oman have laws that criminalize transgender people, using phrases such as "posing as [the opposite sex]" and "imitating" members of the opposite sex. A common claim is that men will pretend to be transgender women to gain an advantage playing on women's teams, despite the lack of evidence for this occurring.

Transgender individuals are often perceived as more deceptive than sexual minorities. Passing, or being perceived as the gender one identifies as, is seen as a deceptive or predatory act. Not passing is also seen as a poor attempt at deception. One study sought to compare the perceived deception of transgender people to another marginalized and concealable identity, atheism, by having non-LGBT, non-atheist participants read hypothetical date situations. The transgender dates were perceived as more deceptive than atheists, regardless of whether they intentionally disclosed that they are transgender or if it was accidentally revealed.

The idea of deception extends to cisgender men's attraction to transgender women. The word 'trap' is used to imply that a transgender woman tricked a man into having gay sex. The trans panic defense also leans into this perceived deception. The trans panic defense is used as a defense strategy in court, claiming the defendant killed the victim due to the emotional provocation of realizing the victim was transgender. According to Professor of Law Cynthia Lee, "Instead of admitting that what he did was wrong, a murder defendant claiming trans panic blames the victim for his actions, arguing that the transgender victim's deceit caused him to lose self-control." After the murder of trans woman Gwen Araujo, the defense lawyer said, "This is the case [...] about [...] the tragic results when that deception and betrayal were discovered." This idea of deception on the part of transgender victims implies they deserved to be killed.

There is also rhetoric that male perverts will pretend to be transgender to enter women's restrooms, which is used to support laws restricting transgender people from choosing which bathroom to use. According to the National Center for Transgender Equality, the Human Rights Campaign, and the American Civil Liberties Union, there is no statistical evidence of violence to support bathroom laws targeting transgender people.

=== Bathroom bills ===
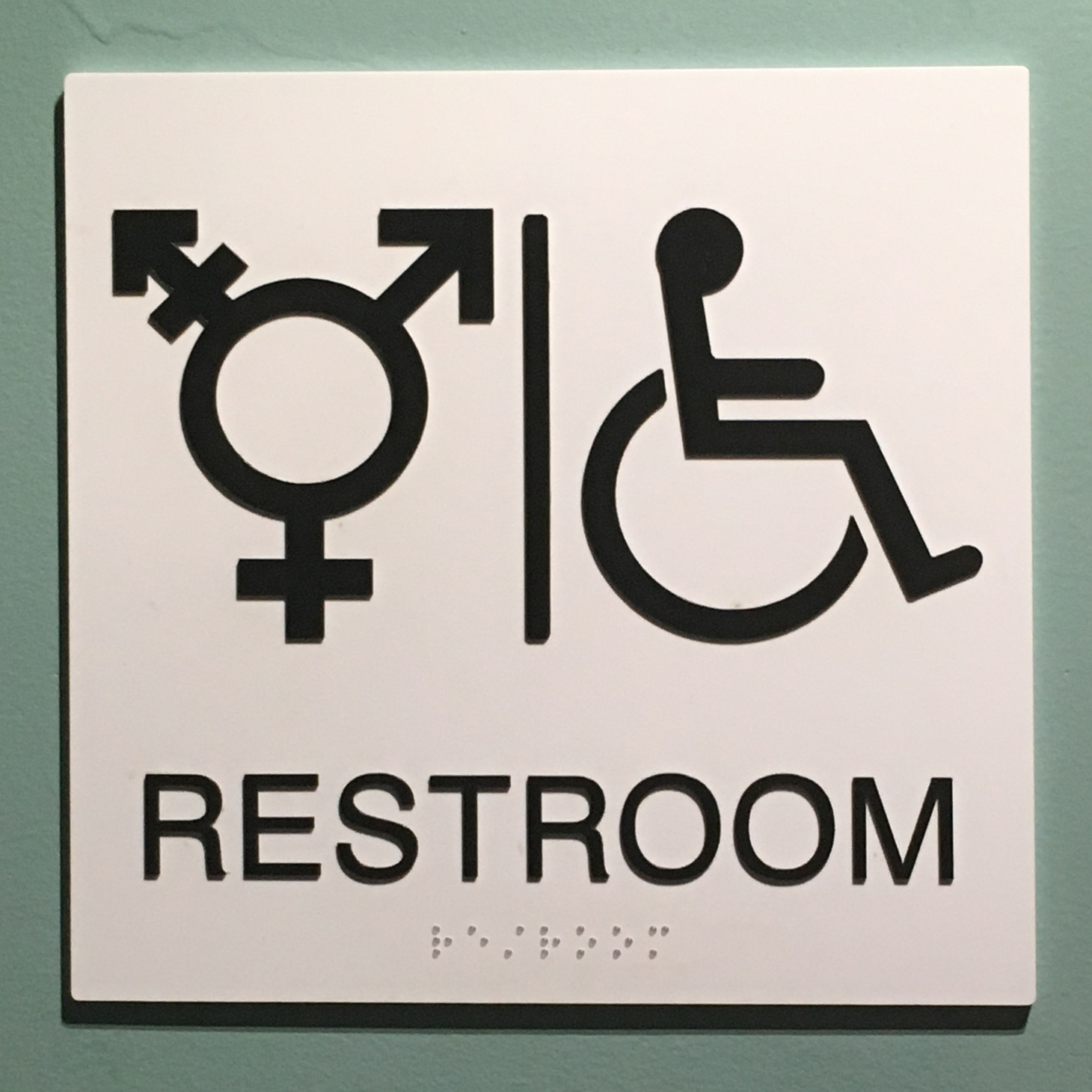
All gender restroom sign in San Diego Natural History Museum

A bathroom bill is the common name for legislation or a statute that defines access to public toilets by gender or transgender identity. Bathroom bills affect access to sex-segregated public facilities for an individual based on a determination of their sex as defined in some specific way, such as their sex as assigned at birth, their sex as listed on their birth certificate, or the sex that corresponds to their gender identity. A bathroom bill can either be inclusive or exclusive of transgender individuals, depending on the aforementioned definition of their sex.

Proponents of the bills argue that such legislation is necessary to maintain privacy, protect modesty held by most cisgender people, prevent voyeurism, assault, molestation, and rape, and ensure psychological comfort. Critics of the bills, including advocacy groups and researchers, argue that such legislation does not enhance safety for cisgender people and may increase risks for transgender and gender non-conforming cisgender people. The UCLA's Williams Institute has tracked prevalence of crimes in bathrooms since the passage of various protections for the transgender population and has found that there has been no significant change in the number of crimes. Organizations such as the American Medical Association, the American Psychological Association, and the American Academy of Pediatrics have expressed opposition to trans-exclusive bathroom bills, citing concerns about their impact on public health and safety.

=== Trans-exclusionary radical feminism ===
Some positions within feminist theory have used denialist rhetoric viewed as transphobic. Those that hold these positions are known as trans-exclusionary radical feminists, or "TERF" for short. This term was coined by feminist blogger Viv Smythe in 2008 as a value-neutral descriptor of feminists who engage in denialism.

In 1979, American radical feminist Janice Raymond published The Transsexual Empire: The Making of the She-Male. In it, she wrote that, "All transsexuals rape women's bodies by reducing the real female form to an artifact, appropriating this body for themselves." A common position in radical feminism maintains that trans women are not women in a literal sense and should not be in women-only spaces.

Some second-wave feminists perceive trans men and women respectively as "traitors" and "infiltrators" to womanhood. In a 1997 article, Australian lesbian feminist Sheila Jeffreys wrote that "[T]ranssexualism should be seen as a violation of human rights." Jeffreys also argued that by transitioning medically and socially, trans women are "constructing a conservative fantasy of what women should be. They are inventing an essence of womanhood which is deeply insulting and restrictive."

=== Social contagion ===
Some anti-transgender rhetoric centers on the idea of transgender identity being due to indoctrination or social contagion. According to GLAAD, "Another prominent anti-LGBTQ trope includes the use of anti-trans buzzwords like 'gender ideology' and 'transgenderism' to claim that the LGBTQ+ community and its allies aim to indoctrinate or brainwash kids into identifying as transgender." Some conservative sources like the Heritage Foundation and Boston Herald have argued that peer pressure and social media causes teens, especially those assigned female at birth, to be influenced into becoming transgender; they argue this results in harm to youth by leading them to undergo transition.

Social contagion rhetoric has seen use in the TERF and transmedicalism community with the term transtrender. This is a pejorative term that implies some people, especially transgender youth and non-binary people, choose to be transgender due to a trend or social contagion.

A scientifically unsupported hypothesis called rapid-onset gender dysphoria (ROGD) also incorporates the idea of social contagion. The hypothesis is that people who identify as transgender in adolescence rather than before puberty do so as a result of social contagion. It is believed that that people assigned female at birth as well as people with mental health issues, neurodevelopmental disorders, or maladaptive coping mechanisms are particularly susceptible to ROGD. Clinical data from transgender adolescents does not support an association between recent/rapid knowledge of one's gender and mental health issues, neurodevelopmental disorders, self-harm, depression symptoms, or social support.

The term rapid-onset gender dysphoria was created in 2016 on 4thWaveNow, a blog against gender-affirming care. Through 4thWaveNow, TransgenderTrend, and Youth Trans Critical Professionals, Lisa Littman found parents to participate in her study on ROGD. The study ended up being corrected after publication to make it clear it established a hypothesis, but did not prove it. Despite the correction, ROGD increased in use following the study.

ROGD has been used to argue against gender affirming care for minors and positive LGBT representation in schools. According to a study in Pediatrics, "The deleterious effect of unfounded hypotheses stigmatizing TGD youth, particularly the ROGD hypothesis, cannot be overstated, especially in current and longstanding public policy debates. Indeed, the notion of ROGD has been used by legislators to prohibit TGD youth from accessing gender-affirming medical care". The Coalition for the Advancement and Application of Psychological Science calls for the elimination of the term due to its potential to limit and stigmatize gender-affirming care.

=== Transgender as mental illness ===
Conservative groups and governments have classified transgender identities as a mental disorder or caused by mental illness. Peru passed a short-lived insurance law in 2024, categorizing transgender identities as a mental disorder. The American College of Pediatricians, described as an anti-LGBT group by the Southern Poverty Law Center, says that "adolescents can embrace their bodies through counseling alone when it is directed toward underlying psychological issues." The belief that non-cisgender identities are mental disorders is an underlying assumption of conversion therapy.

=== Transgender desistance and regret ===
The transgender desistance myth is the idea that most transgender youth are confused, and 80 percent will eventually return to being cisgender. This is based on a series of papers from 2008 to 2013 which have been scrutinized for the following: using outdated diagnostic criteria for gender identity disorder (now gender dysphoria) that conflate gender identity and expression, including children who did not meet the criteria for a gender identity disorder diagnosis, including children who did not assert that they were transgender, disregarding non-binary gender identities, counting children who did not follow-up years later as desisting, and assuming that transgender people who persist must desire medical transition.

As of 2022, most papers about transgender youth desistance are editorials rather than studies. The studies which do exist are considered poor quality. Many do not explicitly define what counts as desistance, and those that do tend to conflate the disappearance of gender dysphoria with returning to a cisgender identity.

Transgender desistance and regret are often used to justify gender affirming care bans for transition. Research shows detransition due to regret is rare. A study of binary transgender youth found that 7.3 percent retransitioned after their first social transition. This includes temporary retransition and transition from binary trans identities (transgender man or transgender woman) to nonbinary. After 5 years, 2.5 percent of the participants identified as cisgender, while 94 percent lived as binary transgender identities and 3.5 percent identified as nonbinary.

After pursuing transition/gender affirmation, 13.1 percent of transgender and gender diverse adults detransition. This includes temporary detransition such as presenting as one's gender assigned at birth during family visits. Most adults detransition due to outside factors such as stigma from their families or society, rather than realizing they are not transgender. 2.1 percent of transgender adults have a history of detransition due to internal factors. Of transgender people who have received gender affirming surgery, 1 percent regret it.

== Legality and censorship ==
Hate speech against LGBT people, or incitement to hatred against them, is criminalized in some countries, for example, the Netherlands, Canada, Norway, and Sweden.

== See also ==
- List of organizations designated by the Southern Poverty Law Center as anti-LGBTQ hate groups
- Biphobia
- "Drop the T"
- Fetishization of LGBTQ people
- Globohomo – Variant of the Cultural Marxism conspiracy theory
- Homophobic propaganda
- Identity politics
- Lavender scare
- Lesbophobia
- LGBTQ stereotypes
- Religion and homosexuality
- Societal attitudes toward homosexuality
- Stop Murder Music
- Transgender health care misinformation
- Transmisogyny
- Transgender violence hoax
