= Alan Tudyk =

American actor (born 1971)

- Tudyk at the 2026 Dragon Con
- Born: Alan Wray Tudyk; March 16, 1971 (age 55); El Paso, Texas, U.S.
- Education: Lon Morris College; Juilliard School
- Occupation: Actor
- Years active: 1997–present
- Spouse: Charissa Barton (m. 2016)

Alan Wray Tudyk (/ˈtjuːdɪk/ TEW-dik; born March 16, 1971) is an American actor. His film work includes roles in 28 Days (2000), A Knight's Tale (2001), Dodgeball: A True Underdog Story (2004), 3:10 to Yuma (2007), and Trumbo (2015). He starred in the black comedy horror film Tucker & Dale vs. Evil (2010).

Known for frequently appearing in science fiction, Tudyk's roles in the genre include Wash on the cult classic space Western drama series Firefly (2002–2003), which he reprised in the 2005 continuation film Serenity, the title role in the series Resident Alien (2021–2025), Dollhouse (2009–2010), and Eric Morden / Mr. Nobody on the series Doom Patrol (2019). He provided voice and motion capture for the robot Sonny in I, Robot (2004) and appeared in Transformers: Dark of the Moon (2011) and Maze Runner: The Scorch Trials (2015).

Tudyk’s voice acting work includes K-2SO in the film Rogue One (2016) and its prequel series Andor (2025), the superhero series Young Justice (2010–2013, 2019), Ludo in Star vs. the Forces of Evil (2015–2019), and Dangerboat in the series The Tick (2017–2019). Tudyk currently voices The Joker and Clayface in the series Harley Quinn. From 2022 to 2025, Tudyk voiced Optimus Prime in the animated series Transformers: EarthSpark. In 2024, he voiced Alex Sartorius / Doctor Phosphorus and returned as Clayface in Creature Commandos. In 2025, he voiced and provided motion capture for 4, AKA "Gary," in James Gunn's Superman. In video games he voiced Mickey in Halo 3: ODST (2009) as well as reprising his roles as K-2SO in Star Wars Battlefront (2015) and as the Green Arrow in the DC Comics video game series Injustice (2013, 2017) and has voiced characters in Walt Disney Animation Studios films since 2012. Including all his roles, he is the third highest-grossing actor of all time.

== Early life ==
Tudyk was born on March 16, 1971, in El Paso, Texas, the son of Betty Loyce (née Wiley) and Timothy Nicholas Tudyk. His father's family is of Polish ancestry. His father was a farmer and his grandparents were cattle ranchers. Tudyk was raised in Plano, Texas, a suburb of Dallas, where he attended Plano Senior High School. He had a brief experience as a stand-up comic before quitting after an angry audience member threatened to kill him. Tudyk studied drama at the Methodist-affiliated Lon Morris College in Jacksonville, Texas, where he won the Academic Excellence award for drama. While in college, he played Beaver Smith in an eastern New Mexico summer stock theater production of Billy the Kid. Tudyk was later accepted into and attended the Juilliard School, but left in 1996 without earning a degree.

== Career ==
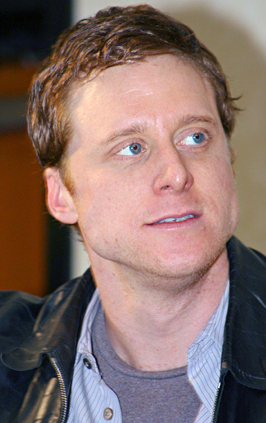
Tudyk at the 2005 Serenity convention

=== Film ===
Tudyk's film debut was in 1997 in Mark Schwahn's independent drama film 35 Miles from Normal. A year later, he had a minor role in the biographical comedy-drama Patch Adams with Robin Williams where he played patient Everton. Tudyk said of the role, that a doctor had given him a shot of adrenaline prior to filming as he had an allergic reaction to food the night before and his windpipe was closing up. In 2000, Tudyk played a gay German drug addict in 28 Days opposite Sandra Bullock. He played Wat in A Knight's Tale, Steve the Pirate in Dodgeball: A True Underdog Story, and the emotional robot Sonny in I, Robot. In 2005, he reprised his role as Hoban "Wash" Washburne in the film Serenity, derived from the television series Firefly by Joss Whedon.

In 2007, Tudyk had a supporting role as a doctor in the western film 3:10 to Yuma. He had a brief role in the film Knocked Up and in the British film Death at a Funeral. Tudyk played Tucker in the indie horror comedy Tucker & Dale vs. Evil. He played Dutch for the film Transformers: Dark of the Moon. In 2012, Tudyk played Stephen A. Douglas in Timur Bekmambetov's film Abraham Lincoln: Vampire Hunter. He played Ben Chapman in the 2013 film 42 about Jackie Robinson.

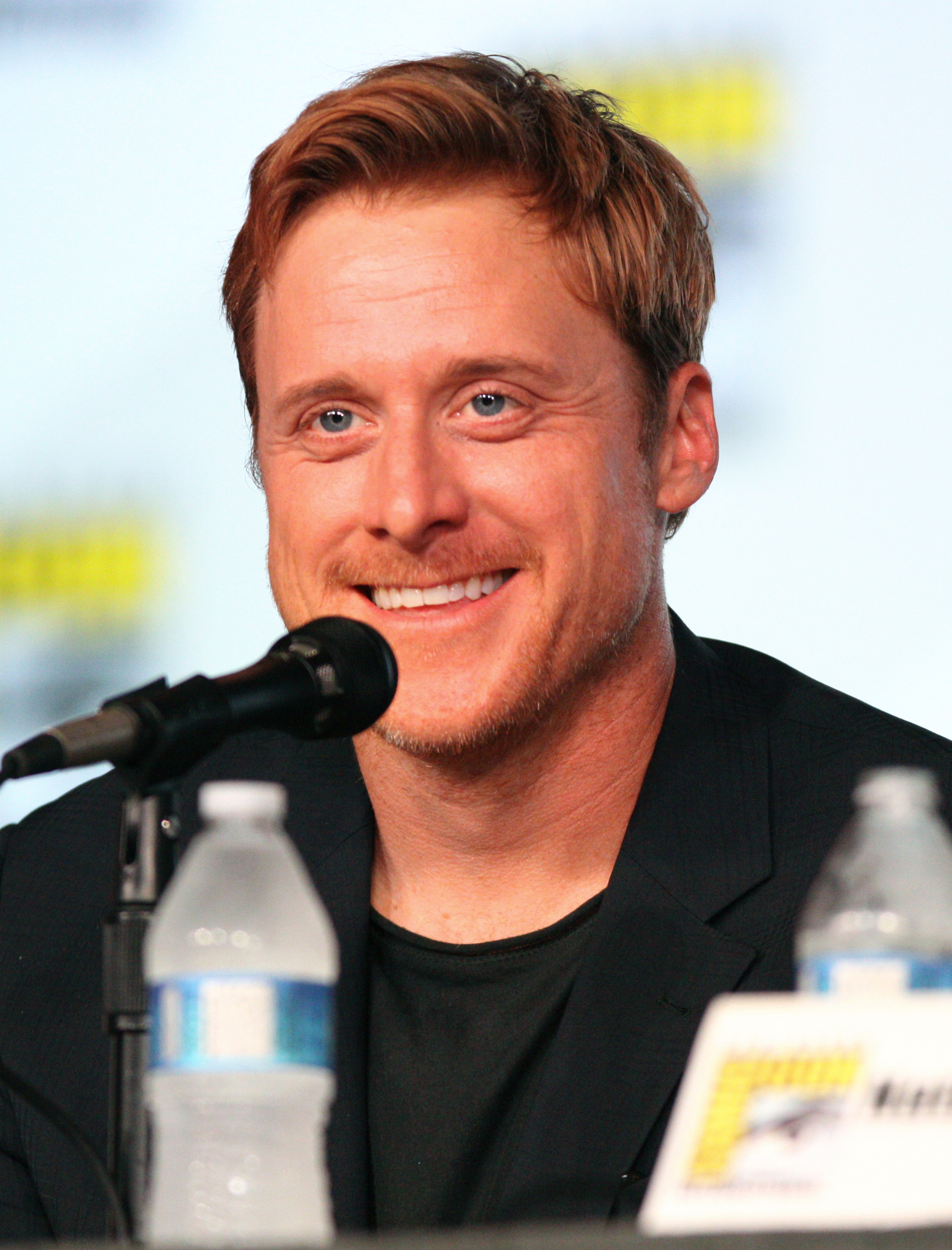
Tudyk at the 2012 San Diego Comic-Con

Tudyk played Noel in Chris Blake's quarantine comedy film Distancing Socially, which was filmed remotely at the height of the COVID-19 pandemic using iPhone 11. It was acquired and released by Cinedigm in October 2021. He played Mr. Darling in the fantasy adventure film Peter Pan & Wendy.

=== Broadway ===
Tudyk made his Broadway debut in Epic Proportions in 1999. He also appeared in Wonder of the World, The Most Fabulous Story Ever Told, Misalliance, Oedipus and Bunny Bunny. Tudyk filled in for Hank Azaria's roles in Spamalot from June to December 2005, and starred in a limited run of Prelude to a Kiss.

=== Television ===
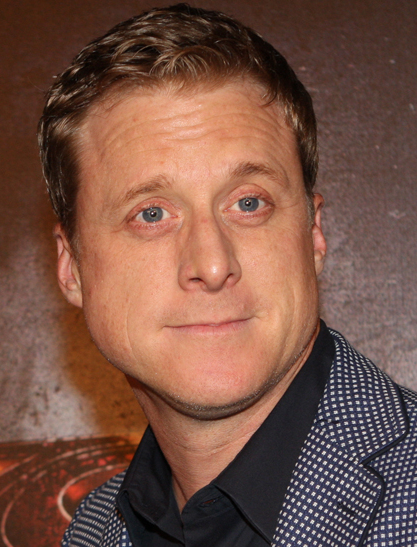
Tudyk at the Man of Steel premiere in June 2013

Tudyk portrayed Hoban "Wash" Washburne in the 2002 television series Firefly by Joss Whedon. The series ran for one season, and Universal Studios purchased the rights to make a film, Serenity, in which Tudyk reprised his role. He did a few voices in Make Way for Noddy.

Tudyk has made several guest spots on shows such as Arrested Development. He appeared as the cult leader, Father, in a two-part episode of Strangers with Candy entitled "Blank Stare". He played a convicted child sex offender on an episode of CSI: Crime Scene Investigation. He was cast as a special guest star in Joss Whedon's Dollhouse. The show featured people whose personalities had been erased, with Tudyk portraying Alpha, a former "active" who accidentally downloaded 48 separate personalities. Alpha served as the main antagonist of the series' first season, with guest appearances in the show's second season. In 2014, Tudyk took over the role of lead anchor on the live-action Adult Swim comedy, Newsreaders.

Tudyk also guest-starred in three episodes of ABC's modern remake of the television miniseries V. He also co-starred in the ABC comedy series Suburgatory as Noah Werner, a dentist from the city, who moves to the suburbs. Tudyk voiced Debbie the prostitute in season 3 of The Life & Times of Tim.

In 2015, Tudyk released his own web series Con Man based loosely upon his experiences touring the convention circuit after the cancellation of Firefly. He was a main cast member of the DC Comics-based show Powerless, portraying Van Wayne.

In 2017, season 2 of Dirk Gently's Holistic Detective Agency saw Tudyk in the role of Mr. Priest, a rogue Blackwing operative who is on familiar terms with Dirk, Bart and the Rowdy 3.

In 2021, he starred in the lead role in the Resident Alien TV series on the Syfy channel. It finished airing after its fourth season.

=== Voice acting ===
Tudyk has provided voice acting work such as Ice Age (2002). In Alvin and the Chipmunks: Chipwrecked, he voiced Simone (a reckless French accent speaking Chipmunk, the result after Simon was bitten by a spider).

He additionally provided the voices of Ludo Avarius and King River Butterfly in the Disney animated series Star vs. the Forces of Evil. He provided the voice of superhero Green Arrow and villain Psimon in the animated series Young Justice.

In 2012, Tudyk voiced King Candy / Turbo in the animated film Wreck-It Ralph, winning the Annie Award for Voice Acting. Since then, he has lent his voice to every Walt Disney Animation Studios film:

- The Duke of Weselton in Frozen
- Alistair Krei in Big Hero 6
- Duke Weaselton in Zootopia and Zootopia 2
- Heihei in Moana and Moana 2
- KnowsMore in the Wreck-It Ralph sequel Ralph Breaks the Internet
- A guard, a Northuldra leader and an Arendellian soldier in Frozen II
- Tuk Tuk in Raya and the Last Dragon
- Pico the toucan in Encanto
- Duffle in Strange World
- Valentino in Wish

Additionally, in 2016, Tudyk played the droid K-2SO in Rogue One: A Star Wars Story and provided the voice of Iago in the 2019 live-action adaptation of Aladdin. Tudyk additionally voiced the Mad Hatter in the 2023 short film Once Upon a Studio, made to celebrate the centennial of The Walt Disney Company.

Tudyk then later returned to the Transformers franchise by voicing Optimus Prime in the EarthSpark animated series.

In 2024, Tudyk played the role of Alex Sartorius / Doctor Phosphorus in Creature Commandos. In 2025, he reprised his role as K-2SO in the second season of Andor.

=== Video games ===
Tudyk voiced an unnamed marine in Halo 3 and the squad's elite trooper in Halo 3: ODST. He, Nathan Fillion and Adam Baldwin gave their likenesses to each character similar to Firefly. Tudyk then reprised his role as Green Arrow in Injustice: Gods Among Us and Injustice 2.

== Personal life ==
Tudyk and choreographer Charissa Barton became engaged in December 2015. They married on September 24, 2016.

== Filmography ==
=== Film ===
Year	Title	Role	Notes
1997	35 Miles from Normal	Trevor	
1998	Patch Adams	Everton	
2000	28 Days	Gerhardt	
2000	Wonder Boys	Traxler	
2001	A Knight's Tale	Wat	
2001	Hearts in Atlantis	Monte Man	
2002	Ice Age	Lenny, Dab, Freaky Mammal (voice)	
2004	Dodgeball: A True Underdog Story	Steve the Pirate	
2004	I, Robot	Sonny (voice and motion capture)	
2004	Meet Market	Danny	
2005	Rx	Pepe	
2005	Serenity	Hoban "Wash" Washburne	
2006	Ice Age: The Meltdown	Cholly (voice)	
2006	Done the Impossible	Himself	Documentary
2007	Death at a Funeral	Simon	
2007	Knocked Up	Jack	
2007	3:10 to Yuma	Doc Potter	
2009	Astro Boy	Mr. Squeegee, Scrapheap Head, Stinger Two (voice)	
2009	Bed Ridden	Detective Kurt	Short film
2009	The Ballad of G.I. Joe	Shipwreck	Short film
2010	Tucker & Dale vs. Evil	Tucker	
2010	Beautiful Boy	Eric	
2011	Transformers: Dark of the Moon	Dutch	
2011	Alvin and the Chipmunks: Chipwrecked	Simone (voice)	
2011	Conception	Mark	
2012	Strange Frame	Chat (voice)	
2012	Abraham Lincoln: Vampire Hunter	Stephen A. Douglas	Uncredited cameo
2012	Ice Age: Continental Drift	Milton, Hunky Siren (voice)	
2012	Wreck-It Ralph	King Candy / Turbo (voice)	
2012	Browncoats Unite: Firefly 10th Anniversary Special	Himself	Documentary
2013	42	Ben Chapman	
2013	Frozen	Duke of Weselton	Voice
2014	Premature	Jack Roth	
2014	Justice League: War	Clark Kent / Superman	Voice; direct-to-video
2014	Big Hero 6	Alistair Krei	Voice
2014	Tell	Morton	
2014	Welcome to Me	Ted Thurber	
2014	Son of a Barman	Bill Snyder	Short film
2015	Maze Runner: The Scorch Trials	Blondie	
2015	Trumbo	Ian McLellan Hunter	
2015	Oddball	Bradley Slater	
2016	Zootopia	Duke Weaselton	Voice
2016	Shangri-La Suite	Dr. Sanborn	
2016	Moana	Heihei, Villager #3	Voice
2016	Rogue One: A Star Wars Story	K-2SO	Voice and motion capture
2018	Deadpool 2	Luke - Redneck #1	
2018	Ralph Breaks the Internet	KnowsMore	Voice
2019	Aladdin	Iago	Voice
2019	Frozen 2	Guard, Northuldra Leader, Arendellian Soldier	Voice
2020	Eat Wheaties!	Dave Lambert	
2021	Raya and the Last Dragon	Tuk Tuk	Voice
2021	Playing God	Ben	
2021	Encanto	Pico	Voice
2021	Distancing Socially	Noel	
2022	Disenchanted	Scroll	Voice
2022	Strange World	Duffle, Radio Host	Voice
2023	Peter Pan & Wendy	Mr. Darling	
2023	Once Upon a Studio	Mad Hatter	Voice, short film
2023	The Trouble with Jessica	Tom	
2023	Wish	Valentino	Voice
2024	Moana 2	Heihei	Voice
2025	The Electric State	Cosmo	Voice
2025	Superman	Superman Robot 4 / Gary	Voice
2025	The Twits	Sweet Toed Toad	Voice
2025	Playdate	Simon Maddox	
2025	Zootopia 2	Duke Weaselton, Raccoon Chef, Molt Kahl, Reporter	Voice
2026	Hexed †	TBA	Voice
2026	Ray Gunn	Barry Vogel	Voice

Key
†	Denotes films that have not yet been released

=== Television ===
Year	Title	Role	Notes
2000	Strangers with Candy	Father	2 episodes
2000	Frasier	Todd Peterson	Episode: "The Great Crane Robbery"
2002–2003	Firefly	Hoban "Wash" Washburne	Main role
2005, 2013, 2019	Arrested Development	Pastor Terry Veal	5 episodes
2005	Into the West	Nathan Wheeler	Episode: "Wheel to the Stars"
2006	Capitol Law	Walker Eliot	Television film
2006	CSI: Crime Scene Investigation	Carl Fisher	Episode: "Burn Out"
2008	Fourplay	Drew	Television film
2008	Play or Be Played	Charlie	Television film
2009	James Gunn's PG Porn	Bob	Episode: "High Poon"
2009	V	Dale Maddox	3 episodes
2009–2010	Dollhouse	Alpha / Stephen Kepler	4 episodes
2009–2010	Glenn Martin, DDS	Additional Voices	5 episodes
2010	The Rockford Files	Detective Dennis Becker	Television film
2010, 2011	Batman: The Brave and the Bold	Barry Allen / The Flash	Voice; 2 episodes
2010–2013, 2019	Young Justice	Green Arrow, Psimon, Captain Cold	Voice; 11 episodes
2011–2020	Robot Chicken	Various voices	4 episodes
2011, 2013, 2016–present	American Dad!	Dr. Kalgary, Mr. Capalini, additional voices	Voice; 31 episodes
2011	Family Guy	German Pilot	Voice; episode "German Guy"
2011–2012	The Life & Times of Tim	Rodrigo, Arthur, Debbie	Voice; 3 episodes
2011	Good Vibes	Lonnie	Voice; main role
2011–2014	Suburgatory	Dr. Noah Werner	Main role
2012	Phineas and Ferb	Additional voices	Voice; episode: "Sipping with the Enemy/Tri-State Treasure: Boot of Secrets"
2012	Napoleon Dynamite	Officer Elwood	Voice; episode: "Ligertown"
2012	NTSF:SD:SUV::	Sven	Episode: "The Real Bicycle Thief"
2012	Robot and Monster	Crazy Cousin Gizmo	Voice; episode: "The Party"
2014	The Team Unicorn Saturday Action Fun Hour!	Chummy Cherub, Sad Tree	Episode: "Pilot"
2014	Justified	Elias Marcos	Episode: "Shot All to Hell"; credited as Wray Nerely
2014	Chozen	Kai, additional voices	Voice; 5 episodes
2014–2016	TripTank	Terrence, Bootf***er	Voice; 6 episodes
2014–2015	Newsreaders	Reagan Biscayne	Main role
2014	Comedy Bang! Bang!	Ray Starksy	Episode: "The Lonely Island Wear Holiday Sweaters & White Pants"
2015, 2017	Adventure Time	Chatsberry, additional voices	Voice; 2 episodes
2015, 2020	Rick and Morty	Chris, Observant Glorzo	Voice; 3 episodes
2015–2019	Star vs. the Forces of Evil	Ludo Avarius, River Butterfly	Voice; recurring role
2015–2016	The Adventures of Puss in Boots	Uli	Voice; 10 episodes
2016	Clarence	Flight Attendant Dan	Voice; episode: "Plane Excited"
2017	Powerless	Van Wayne	Main role
2017	Dirk Gently's Holistic Detective Agency	Mr. Priest	6 episodes
2017	Future-Worm!	Additional voices	3 episodes
2017–2019	The Tick	Dangerboat	Voice; recurring role
2017–2021	Big Hero 6: The Series	Alistair Krei	Voice; recurring role
2018	Lego Star Wars: All Stars	K-2SO	Voice; episode: "From Trenches to Wrenches: The Roger Story"
2019, 2021	Final Space	Todd H. Watson, Hushfluffles	Voice; 3 episodes
2019	Doom Patrol	Eric Morden / Mr. Nobody	Main role (season 1); 8 episodes
2019	Archibald's Next Big Thing	Mr. Garbage	Episode: "The Oath of the Compass/Garbage Fruit"
2019, 2022	The Rookie	Ellroy Basso	2 episodes
2019–2025	Harley Quinn	Joker, Clayface, Calendar Man, Condiment King, Doctor Trap, Firefly, Ocean Master, various voices	Voice; main role
2020	Curb Your Enthusiasm	Boris	Episode: "The Surprise Party"
2020	Solar Opposites	Nanobot Man	Voice; episode: "The Unstable Grey Hole"
2020	The Wonderful World of Mickey Mouse	House of Tomorrow	Voice; episode: "House of Tomorrow"
2021–2025	Resident Alien	Dr. Harry Vanderspeigle	44 episodes
2021	M.O.D.O.K.	Arcade	Voice, 2 episodes
2021	Devil May Care	Devil	Voice; main role
2022	Zootopia+	Duke Weaselton	Voice; episode: "Duke the Musical"
2022–2025	Transformers: EarthSpark	Optimus Prime	Voice; main role
2023	Praise Petey	Himself	Voice; episode: "Taxi to the South!"
2024	Ark: The Animated Series	The Captain	Voice; main role
2024	Monsters at Work	Pierre, Michel, Maître d', M.E.R.C. Official 2, Alarmed Monster	Voice; minor roles; 3 episodes
2024	Kite Man: Hell Yeah!	Clayface, Ocean Master	Voice; episode: "Sexiest Villain Alive, Hell Yeah!"
2024–2025	WondLa	Cadmus Pryde	Voice; main role
2024–present	Creature Commandos	Doctor Phosphorus, Clayface, Will Magnus	Voice; main role
2024–present	Grimsburg	Dr. Rufis Pentos / Mr. Flesh	Voice; main role
2025	Andor	K-2SO	Voice and motion capture; 3 episodes
2026	Life, Larry and the Pursuit of Unhappiness	Thomas Jefferson	Episode: "Livingston"
TBA	Firefly: the Animated Series †	Hoban "Wash" Washburne	Voice; main role

Key
†	Denotes television productions that have not yet been released

=== Video games ===
Year	Title	Voice
2006	Ice Age 2: The Meltdown	Cholly
2007	Halo 3	Marines
2007	Defense Grid: The Awakening	Simon
2009	Halo 3: ODST	Mickey
2009	Astro Boy: The Video Game	Mr. Windex
2013	Injustice: Gods Among Us	Green Arrow
2014	Call of Duty: Advanced Warfare	Additional voices
2015	Infinite Crisis	Green Arrow
2015	Star Wars Battlefront	K-2SO
2016	Master of Orion: Conquer the Stars	Psilon Advisor
2017	Injustice 2	Green Arrow
2023	Marvel's Spider-Man 2	Bodega Cat

=== Theatre ===
Year	Title	Role	Theatre
1997	Bunny Bunny	All Others	Lucille Lortel Theatre, Off-Broadway
1997	Misalliance	Bently Summerhays	Laura Pels Theatre, Off-Broadway
1998–1999	The Most Fabulous Story Ever Told	Adam	New York Theatre Workshop/Minetta Lane Theatre, Off-Broadway
1999	Epic Proportions	Benny Bennet	Helen Hayes Theatre, Broadway
2001–2002	Wonder of the World	Kip Harris	New York City Center Stage I, Off-Broadway
2005	Spamalot	Lancelot (replacement)	Shubert Theatre, Broadway
2007	Prelude to a Kiss	Peter	American Airlines Theatre, Broadway
2009	An Evening Without Monty Python	Himself	Ricardo Montalbán Theatre (Los Angeles); The Town Hall (New York City)
2012	That Beautiful Laugh	—N/a	La MaMa Experimental Theatre Club, Off-Off-Broadway
2019	Mysterious Circumstances	Richard Lancelyn Green, Sherlock Holmes	Geffen Playhouse, Regional

=== Web ===
Year	Title	Role	Notes
2014	TableTop	Himself/Doctor McLickhertitty	Episode: "Forbidden Desert"
2015–2017	Con Man	Wray Nerely	Also creator, director, writer and executive producer
2026	Theme Song Takeover	Ludo Avarius	Episode: Ludo Takes Over the Star vs. the Forces Of Evil Theme Song

== Awards and nominations ==
- Nominated for the MTV Movie Award for Best On-Screen Team for Dodgeball: A True Underdog Story (2004)
- Nominated for the Screen Actors Guild Award for Outstanding Performance by a Cast in a Motion Picture for 3:10 to Yuma (2007)
- Won the Annie Award for Voice Acting in a Feature Production for Wreck-It Ralph (2012)
- Nominated for the Critics' Choice Movie Award for Best Acting Ensemble for Trumbo (2015)
- Nominated for the Screen Actors Guild Award for Outstanding Performance by a Cast in a Motion Picture for Trumbo (2015)
- Nominated for a Primetime Emmy Award for Outstanding Actor in a Short Form Comedy or Drama Series for Con Man (2017)
- Nominated for Outstanding Character Voice-Over Performance at the 77th Primetime Creative Arts Emmy Awards for Andor ("Who Else Knows?") (2025)
- Inducted as a Disney Legend at D23 for his various contributions across the studio (2026)

== Bibliography ==
=== Con Man Comics ===
- Spectrum #0–1 (script 2016)

=== Star Wars ===
- Star Wars Adventures Vol. 2: Unexpected Detour (K-2SO's Dialogue writer 2018, ISBN 168405169X; ISBN 978-1684051694)
