= Christopher Ashley =

American stage director

- Born: July 6, 1964 (age 62)
- Education: Yale University (BA)

Christopher Ashley (born July 6, 1964) is an American stage director. He is the Artistic Director of Roundabout Theatre Company and was previously the Artistic Director of La Jolla Playhouse from 2007 to 2025.

== Career ==
Ashley graduated from Yale University in 1986, with a Bachelor of Art in Theatre. In 1987, he completed The Drama League program for directors.

He directed many Off-Broadway stage productions, including at Manhattan Theatre Club. He directed Jeffrey by Paul Rudnick Off-Broadway at the WPA Theatre in 1993, for which he received the Lucille Lortel Award for Outstanding Director. He also directed the film version, which was released in 1995.

He directed the Sondheim Kennedy Center Celebration productions of Sweeney Todd and Merrily We Roll Along in 2002.

In 2007, he was appointed artistic director of La Jolla Playhouse, California. He directed the musical version of the 1980 cult film Xanadu on Broadway, receiving a Drama Desk Award nomination for direction.

Ashley directed the musical Memphis, which opened on Broadway in October 2009, receiving the Outer Critics Circle Award nomination for Outstanding Director and Tony Award nomination, Best Direction of a Musical.

He directed the new musical Come from Away, which premiered at La Jolla Playhouse in June 2015, and opened on Broadway in February 2017 at the Gerald Schoenfeld Theatre, receiving a Tony Award for Best Direction of a Musical. He was originally set to direct a film adaptation of the musical, which was canceled on February 2, 2021, because of the COVID-19 pandemic. Instead, he directed a live stage film recording of the show at the Schoenfeld Theatre in front of an invited audience including survivors and first responders from the 9/11 attacks, which was released on Apple TV+ on September 10, 2021, to coincide with the 20th anniversary of the attacks.

He directed the musical version of Freaky Friday, which premiered at the Signature Theatre, Arlington, Virginia in October 2016.

The 2021 film musical Diana, directed by Ashley, was released on Netflix on October 1, 2021.

In September 2024, Ashley was hired by the Roundabout Theatre Company as its artistic director. He will begin his tenure in July 2026.

In 2025, he directed the world premiere of The Heart at the La Jolla Playhouse, which he will again direct Off-Broadway in the Fall of 2026.

== Personal life ==
Ashley is openly gay. He is married to Ranjit Bahadur.

== Work ==
Broadway

- Diana (2021)
- Escape to Margaritaville (2018)
- Come from Away (2017) Tony Award, Best Direction of a Musical
- Leap of Faith (2012)
- Memphis (2009)
- Xanadu (2007)
- The 24 Hour Plays (2005) (Special Benefit): That Other Person"
- All Shook Up (2005)
- The Smell of the Kill (2002)
- The Rocky Horror Show (2000) (Revival) Tony Award nomination, Direction of a Musical
- Voices in the Dark (1999)
- Jackie (1997) (Production consultant)

Off-Broadway (select)

- Blown Sideways Through Life written by Claudia Shear (1993 and 1994), also TV film (1995)
- Jeffrey (1992 and 1993), also the film version (1995)
- Fires in the Mirror: Crown Heights, Brooklyn and Other Identities, written by Anna Deavere Smith (1992) Lucille Lortel Award, Outstanding Director
- The Most Fabulous Story Ever Told (1998)
- Communicating Doors, written by Alan Ayckbourn (1998)
- Valhalla (2004), written by Paul Rudnick; Lucille Lortel Award nomination, Outstanding Director

Regional

- Babbitt, La Jolla Playhouse (2023)
- The Untitled Unauthorized Hunter S. Thompson Musical, La Jolla Playhouse (2023)
- Escape to Margaritaville, La Jolla Playhouse (2017)
- Freaky Friday, Signature Theatre (2016)
- Come from Away, La Jolla Playhouse (2015)
