= The Most Fabulous Story Ever Told =

1998 metaphysical/existentialist comedy written by Paul Rudnick

- Original language: English
- Written by: Paul Rudnick
- Characters: Adam; Steve; Jane; Mabel; Stage Manager
- Genre: Metaphysical Comedy

Premiere
- Date: July 1, 1998
- Place: Nikos Stage, Williamstown Theatre Festival; Williamstown, Massachusetts

The Most Fabulous Story Ever Told is a metaphysical/existentialist comedy written in 1998 by Paul Rudnick.

== Original Production ==
The play was originally produced at the Williamstown Theatre Festival on the Nikos Stage, opening on July 1, 1998. The show was directed by Christopher Ashley, set design Michael Brown, costume design Marion Williams, lighting design Rui Rita, and sound design Kurt B. Kellenberger. The cast starred Dara Fisher (Stage Manager), Alan Tudyk (Adam), Bobby Cannavale (Steve), Maggie Moore (Matinee Lady, et al.), Michael Wiggins (Priest, et al.), Peter Bartlett (Latecomer, et al.), Michi Barall (Cheryl Mindle, et al.), Becky Ann Baker (Jane), and Jessica Hecht (Mabel).

The play would transfer to the New York Theatre Workshop, with Ashley directing, set design Brown, costume design Susan Hilferty, lighting design Donald Holder, and sound design Darron L. West. The cast starred Tudyk (Adam), Bartlett (Latecomer, et al.), Baker (Jane), Amy Sedaris (Stage Manager), Juan Carlos Hernandez (Steve), Orlando Pabotoy (Father Joseph, et al.), Lisa Kron (Miriam Miller et al.), Joanna P. Adler (Cheryl Mindel et al.), and Kathryn Meisle (Mabel). Jenny Bacon was playing Mabel, but broke her foot a few days before opening, and was replaced by Meisle.

After that, the production transferred to the Minetta Lane Theatre, the only changes to the cast was Peg Healey (Stage Manager) and Jay Goede (Steve).

== Reviews ==
Ben Brantley of the New York Times said, "there's reverence in Mr. Rudnick's irreverence, an earnest warmth beneath the frivolity" and "Line by line, Mr. Rudnick may be the funniest writer for the stage in the United States today...".

== Controversy ==
The show's content, which includes reinterpreting biblical narratives and portraying Adam as homosexual, has led to protests surrounding its performances. Rudnick responded to his critics by stating, "tell them I spoke to God personally and he said they're wrong." The 2002 production at the University of California, Santa Cruz saw protests from figures such as Jerry Falwell and Margie Phelps of the Westboro Baptist Church. In 2013, Oklahoma state representative Dan Fisher characterized the production as a "direct frontal attack" on Christians. That same year, a production in Dallas faced protests from the organization America Needs Fatima. In 2017, America Needs Fatima again protested a performance in Atlanta.
