= I Shudder =

2009 book by Paul Rudnick

- Author: Paul Rudnick
- Language: English
- Genre: Humor, essays
- Publisher: HarperCollins
- Publication date: 2009
- Publication place: United States
- ISBN: 978-0-061-78018-9
- OCLC: 310399093

I Shudder: And Other Reactions to Life, Death, and New Jersey is a 2009 collection of comedic essays written by Paul Rudnick.

== Television pilot ==
The book was adapted into a 2016 television pilot written by Paul Rudnick and starring Megan Hilty, Hamish Linklater and John Behlmann.
