= Jeffrey (play) =

1993 play by Paul Rudnick

- Written by: Paul Rudnick
- Subject: An actor/waiter reexamines his life after being wooed by a man with HIV
- Genre: Comedy

Premiere
- Date: December 1992
- Place: WPA Theatre (1992–93); Minetta Lane Theatre (1993)

Jeffrey is a 1992 American play by Paul Rudnick. At first no theater would produce the play, because it was described as a comedy about AIDS, but after an acclaimed, sold-out run at the tiny WPA Theater in New York City, the show transferred for a commercial run. The play ran from December 31, 1992 to February 14, 1993 at the WPA Theatre.

== Productions ==
The original production opened in January 1993 at the WPA Theatre, directed by Christopher Ashley, set and projection design James Youmans, lighting design Donald Holder, costume design David C. Woolard, sound design Donna Riley, and wig and hair design David H. Lawrence. The cast starred John Michael Higgins (Jeffrey), Patrick Kerr (Man #1 in Bed/Gym Rat/Skip Winkly/Casting Director/Headdress Waiter/Man #2), Darryl Theirse (Man #2 in Bed/Gym Rat/Salesman/Boss/Man #1/Chaps man/Thug #1/Young Priest/Sean), Richard Poe (Man #3 in Bed/Gym Rat/Don/Tim/Dad/Mr. Dan/Chuck Farling), Bryan Batt (Darius/Man #4 in Bed), Edward Hibbert (Sterling/Man #5 in Bed), Tom Hewitt (Steve/Man #6 in Bed), and Harriet Sansom Harris (Woman in Bed/Showgirl/Ann Marwood Bartle/Debra Moorhouse/Sharon/Mom/Mrs. Marcangelo). Notable replacements included Jeff Hayenga (Jeffrey), Peter Bartlett (Sterling), Anthony M. Brown (Steve), Demitri Corbin (Sean), Anne Lange (Sharon), Keith Langsdale (Don), Greg Louganis (Darius), Albert Macklin (Dave), Theresa McElwee (Sharon), and Scott Whitehurst (Sean).

It was later adapted into a film in 1995, written by Rudnick and directed by Ashley, with only Batt reprising his role.

== Reviews ==
Frank Rich of the New York Times wrote that the show was "the funniest play of this season and maybe last season, too."

== Awards and nominations ==
Year	Award	Category	Nominee	Result
1993	Lucille Lortel Awards	Lucille Lortel Award for Outstanding Director	Christopher Ashley	Won
1993	Drama Desk Award	Outstanding Play	Steven Baruch, Richard Frankel, Mitchell Maxwell, Paul Rudnick, Alan J. Schuster, Tom Viertel, and The WPA Theatre	Nominated
1993	Drama Desk Award	Outstanding Director of a Play	Christopher Ashley	Nominated
1993	Drama Desk Award	Outstanding Featured Actress in a Play	Harriet Sansom Harris	Nominated
1993	Obie Award	Obie Award for Playwriting	Paul Rudnick	Won
1993	Obie Award	Obie Award for Direction	Christopher Ashley	Won
1993	Obie Award	Obie Award for Distinguished Performance by an Actor	Edward Hibbert	Won
1993	Outer Critics Circle Award	Outstanding Off-Broadway Play	Jeffrey	Won
1993	Outer Critics Circle Award	John Gassner Award	Paul Rudnick	Won
