= Jeffrey (1995 film) =

- Original theatrical poster
- Directed by: Christopher Ashley
- Screenplay by: Paul Rudnick
- Based on: Jeffrey by Paul Rudnick
- Produced by: Mark Balsam; Victoria Maxwell; Mitchell Maxwell; Paul Rudnick
- Starring: Steven Weber; Patrick Stewart; Michael T. Weiss; Bryan Batt; Sigourney Weaver
- Cinematography: Jeffrey J. Tufano
- Edited by: Cara Silverman
- Music by: Stephen Endelman
- Distributed by: Orion Classics
- Release date: August 18, 1995
- Running time: 92 minutes
- Country: United States
- Language: English
- Box office: $3.5 million

Jeffrey is a 1995 American romantic comedy film directed by Christopher Ashley, based on the play of the same name by Paul Rudnick, who also wrote the screenplay adaptation. The film stars Steven Weber, Michael T. Weiss, Patrick Stewart, and Bryan Batt.

== Plot ==
The story takes place in Manhattan during the height of the AIDS epidemic and revolves around Jeffrey, a gay man who has sworn off sex because of the epidemic. It is not so much that Jeffrey is afraid of dying, but that he is afraid that he will fall in love with someone who is bound to die; thus, his celibacy is about sex and about relationships in general. Almost immediately thereafter, Jeffrey meets Steve, a hunky, charming HIV-positive man. He experiences an emotional conflict as he must face his fear in order to accept love, often breaking the fourth wall to do so. With the help of friends, including interior decorator Sterling and his partner Darius, as well as a cast of cameos, he is able to overcome his fears and begin a relationship with Steve.

== Cast ==
- Steven Weber as Jeffrey
- Michael T. Weiss as Steve Howard
- Patrick Stewart as Sterling
- Bryan Batt as Darius

Cameos

- Peter Jacobson as Jeffrey's hook-up #1
- Mark L. Nelson as Lover crying in bed
- K. Todd Freeman as Barney's waiter
- Robert Klein as Skip Winkley
- Christine Baranski as Ann Marwood Bartle
- Patrick Kerr as various
- Victor Garber as Tim
- Camryn Manheim as Single Woman
- J. Smith-Cameron as Sharon
- Sigourney Weaver as Debra Moorehouse
- Kathy Najimy as Acolyte
- Ethan Phillips as Dave
- Thom Fitzgerald as Guy in Central Park
- Peter Maloney as Jeffrey's father
- Debra Monk as Jeffrey's mother
- Michele Pawk as Young Mother
- Nathan Lane as Father Dan
- Lenka Peterson as Church lady #2
- Olympia Dukakis as Mrs. Marcangelo
- Gregory Jbara as Angelique Marcangelo
- Kevin Nealon as news reporter (uncredited)
- Jimmy Somerville as pride attendee (uncredited)

== Production ==
Filming took place from July 11 to August 14, 1994.

== Critical reception ==
Reviews to Jeffrey were positive, as it holds a 71% rating on Rotten Tomatoes, based on 31 reviews. The critical consensus reads, "Jeffrey offends as readily as it amuses, but an outstanding performance from Patrick Stewart keeps it from going completely off the rails."

Caryn James from The New York Times wrote, “For anyone who missed the play, the film offers a strong echo of its best qualities and a couple of truly hilarious moments.” Patrick Stewart got great acclaim for his supporting role, winning several critics awards, and even generated Oscar buzz, but failed to secure a nomination.

The film grossed $3.488 million in the U.S.

== Home media ==
Jeffrey was released on VHS after its initial theatrical run and on DVD in 2003. Shout! Factory released the film on Blu-ray in 2019.
