= Poor Little Lambs =

Poor Little Lambs is a play by Paul Rudnick. It was first produced at the Theater at St. Peter's Church in the Citicorp Center in Manhattan, New York City, in 1982. The 1982 production, which featured David Naughton of An American Werewolf in London fame, is notable for including in its cast a number of young actors who were beginning to achieve, or later achieved, significant success in television or movies, including Kevin Bacon, Gedde Watanabe and Bronson Pinchot.

The play is a comedy that takes place at Yale University, in New Haven, Connecticut, during the period when Yale College was first becoming coeducated. A feminist transfer student from Vassar College named Claire Hazard wishes to join the all-male a cappella singing group called The Whiffenpoofs, who are not amenable to the idea of adding a woman to their group.

The title of the play is a reference to the lyrics of "The Whiffenpoof Song", a traditional song of Yale, which the Whiffenpoofs sing at the end of each of their performances.

In February 2018, the Whiffenpoofs tapped Sofía Campoamor to be the first female member of the group.
