= Minetta Lane Theatre =

Off-Broadway theater in Manhattan, New York

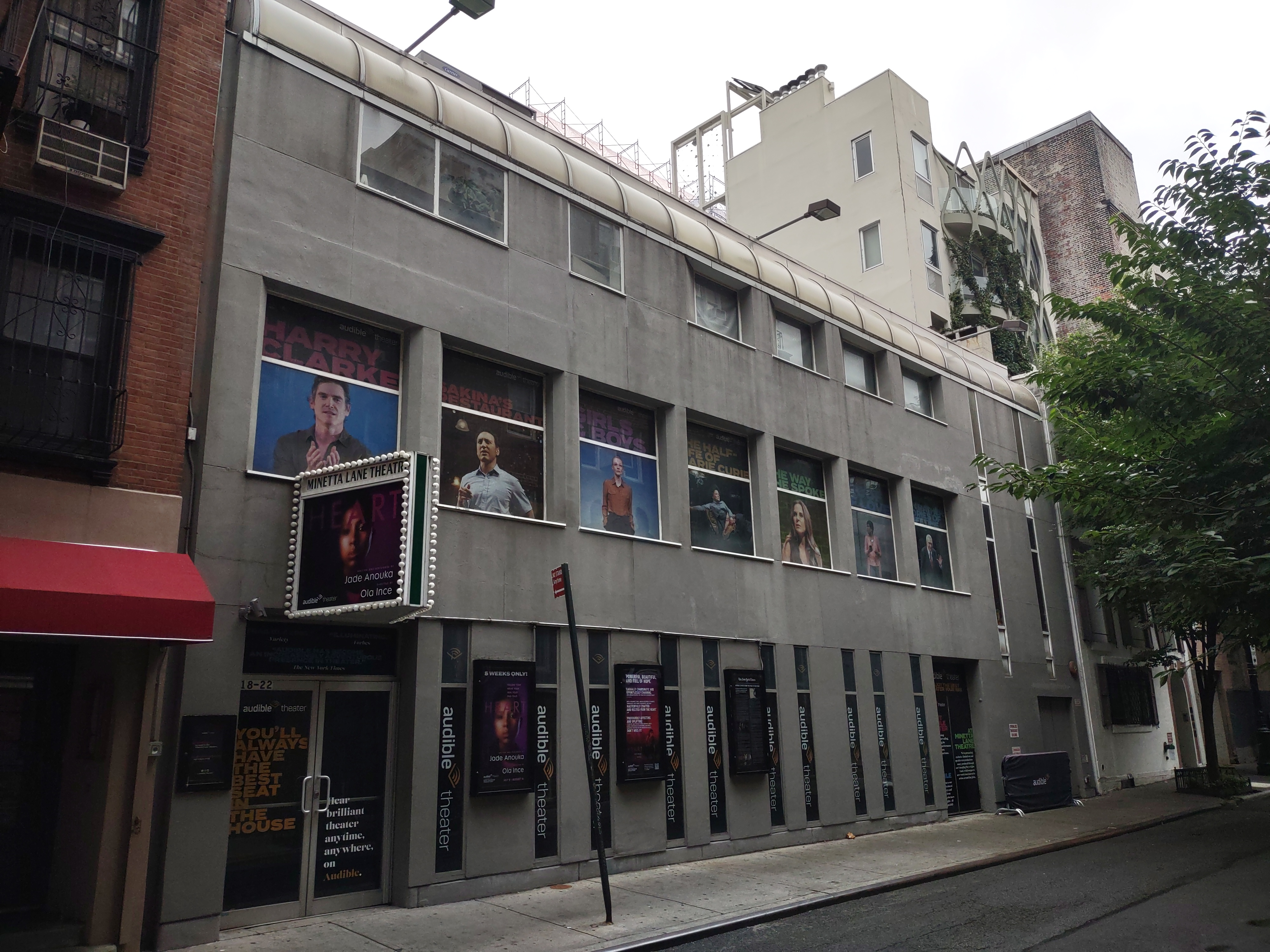
- (2022)
- Interactive map of Minetta Lane Theatre
- Address: 18 Minetta Lane; New York City, New York; United States
- Coordinates: 40.730464°N 74.001191°W
- Owner: Liberty Theatres (Reading International)
- Capacity: 391

Construction
- Opened: 1984

Tenant
- Audible

The Minetta Lane Theatre is a 391-seat off-Broadway theatre at 18 Minetta Lane in the Greenwich Village neighborhood of Lower Manhattan in New York City.

== Building features ==
The Minetta Lane Theatre sits in the Greenwich Village neighborhood of Lower Manhattan in New York City, between Sixth Avenue and MacDougal Street. The name of the theatre comes from the Minetta Brook, a water feature which once flowed through the neighborhood. In 1984 when the theatre opened, Helen Hayes cut the inaugural ribbon and mayor Edward I. Koch declared the week to be Minetta Lane Theater Week.

The theatre has 391 seats, with both an orchestra and a balcony. The New York Theatre Guide described it as an "intimate space." It has limited accessible seating and a concessions stand which offers soft drinks, snacks, beer, and wine.

The theatre is owned by Liberty Theatres, a subsidiary of Reading International, which also owns the Orpheum in the East Village, Manhattan.

== Productions ==
After hosting a brief transfer of Balm in Gilead in 1984, the theatre had its inaugural production with 3 Guys Naked from the Waist Down in 1985. Notable productions since include Marvin's Room in 1992, Jeffrey in 1994, The Last Five Years in 2002, and Adding Machine in 2008.

Since 2018, audiobook company Audible has used the theatre as its creative home for its full productions and staged readings. Notable productions since Audible's residency include Harry Clarke and Girls & Boys in 2018, The Half-Life of Marie Curie in 2019, Dead Outlaw in 2024, Mexodus in 2025, and What Happened Was in 2026. Many of these productions are recorded live and later distributed to Audible listeners.
