= Paul Rudnick =

American writer

- Born: December 29, 1957 (age 68); Piscataway, New Jersey, U.S.
- Education: Yale University
- Occupation: Writer
- Partner: John Raftis
- Writing career
- Genres: Humor, drama

Paul Rudnick (born December 29, 1957) is an American novelist, playwright, screenwriter, and essayist. His plays have been produced on and off Broadway. He wrote the screenplays for Sister Act, Addams Family Values, Jeffrey, and In & Out. Rudnick also wrote film criticism under the pseudonym Libby Gelman-Waxner.

== Early life ==
Rudnick was born and raised in a Jewish family in Piscataway, New Jersey. His mother, Selma, was a publicist, and his father, Norman, was a physicist. He attended Piscataway High School and earned a bachelor's degree from Yale University in 1977. Afterward, he moved to New York.

== Plays and novels ==
Rudnick's first play was Poor Little Lambs, a comedy about a female Yale student's attempt to join The Whiffenpoofs, an all-male singing group. Produced in 1982, the play's cast featured Kevin Bacon, Bronson Pinchot, and Blanche Baker. Rudnick's first novel, Social Disease, a satire of New York nightlife, was released in 1986.

In the late 1980s, Rudnick moved into the top floor of a Greenwich Village brownstone, which had once been the 1920s home of the actor John Barrymore. This move inspired Rudnick's play, I Hate Hamlet, about a young TV star who is visited by the ghost of Barrymore before acting in a production of Hamlet. The play was produced on Broadway and gained attention when Nicol Williamson, the actor playing Barrymore, reportedly began attacking his co-star during a dueling scene.

From December 31, 1992, to February 14, 1993, Rudnick's show Jeffrey, a comedy about AIDS, ran at the WPA Theatre in New York City. It was then transferred to the larger Off-Broadway Minetta Lane Theatre, running from March 6, 1993, to January 16, 1994. Rudnick received acclaim for Jeffrey, winning an Obie Award, an Outer Critics Circle Award, and the John Gassner Playwrighting Award for the same work.

Rudnick's later plays included The Naked Truth (1994, subsequently revised and rereleased as The Naked Eye in 1996), which depicted a photographer similar to Robert Mapplethorpe, and in 1998, The Most Fabulous Story Ever Told, inspired by the homophobic remark, "God made Adam and Eve, not Adam and Steve." In Rudnick's adaptation of the Bible, God makes Adam and Steve, along with the first lesbians, Jane and Mabel. While the play faced criticism from religious groups, it was still picked up for a commercial run.

Rudnick also wrote Valhalla, which entwined the lives of a World War II soldier from Texas with Ludwig, the Mad King of Bavaria; Regrets Only, a drawing room comedy starring Christine Baranski and George Grizzard; and The New Century, a collection of related one-acts produced at the Lincoln Center, for which the actress Linda Lavin won a Drama Desk Award.

Rudnick has contributed two pieces, The Gay Agenda and My Husband, to the Off-Broadway anthology Standing on Ceremony: The Gay Marriage Plays. My Husband was released by Playing on Air as a radio play for podcasting and public radio, featuring Michael Urie and Harriet Harris, directed by Claudia Weill.

In September 2017, Rudnick's play Big Night opened at the Kirk Douglas Theatre in Los Angeles, where it played until October. Wendie Malick starred in this Oscar-themed tragicomedy, which was described as "an often amusing but mostly muddled ensemble piece."

== Screenwriting ==
Rudnick has worked as an uncredited script doctor on films including The Addams Family and The First Wives Club. He was credited under the pseudonym "Joseph Howard" for his work on Sister Act. At the time, Rudnick refused to have his real name associated with the script. He received sole writing credit for Addams Family Values, In & Out, and the screen version of his play Jeffrey.

Rudnick's later screenwriting works included Isn't She Great and the 2004 remake of The Stepford Wives. His script, Coastal Elites, a socially distanced film about the COVID-19 pandemic, began airing on HBO in September 2020.

== Other writings ==
In 2011, HarperCollins published I Shudder, a collection of autobiographical essays Rudnick wrote. Since 1998, Rudnick has contributed over fifty short humor pieces to The New Yorker, his work appearing in the collections Fierce Pajamas and Disquiet, Please.

In 1988, Rudnick began producing satirical film criticism for Premiere magazine. He wrote from the perspective of a married woman, Libby Gelman-Waxner, who lived in Manhattan. A collection of these columns was published in 1994 under the title If You Ask Me. Rudnick (as Libby) resumed writing a monthly column for Entertainment Weekly in 2011 and occasionally contributes reviews to The New Yorker.

Rudnick's first young adult novel, Gorgeous, was published by Scholastic in 2013. Publishers Weekly stated in a review that the book included "writing that's hilarious, profane and profound (often within a single sentence)." Scholastic also published Rudnick's second young adult novel, It's All Your Fault, which Booklist called "A laugh-out-loud, irreverent tale built on as much snarkiness as sweetness. A riotously good read."

Berkley published his novel, Playing the Palace, in May 2021.

In 2023, Simon & Schuster published Rudnick's novel, Farrell Covington and the Limits of Style. Publishers Weekly described the book as "dazzling and funny" in a review. His novel What Is Wrong With You? was published by Simon & Schuster in March 2025. In a starred review, Kirkus called the book "the cure for your bad mood." The Tuxedo Society, Rudnick's comic espionage thriller was published in May 2026.

== Personal life ==
Rudnick has been in a long-term relationship with his partner, John Raftis, since 1993. Their partnership is often reflected in Rudnick's work, which celebrates LGBTQ+ themes and relationships.

== Bibliography ==
=== Plays and musicals ===
- Poor Little Lambs (1982)
- I Hate Hamlet (1991)
- Jeffrey. New York: Plume. 1994. (Note: Play originally produced in 1992.)
  - Jeffrey. New York: Dramatists Play Service. 1995.
- The Naked Truth (1994)
- The Most Fabulous Story Ever Told (1998)
- Rude Entertainment (2001)
- Valhalla. New York: Dramatists Play Service. 2004.
- Regrets Only (2006)
- The New Century (2008)
- The collected plays of Paul Rudnick. New York: Dey Street Books/HarperCollins. 2010.
- The naked eye. New York: Dramatists Play Service. 2010. (Note: Play originally produced in 1996, as a revision of The naked truth.)
- Standing on Ceremony: The Gay Marriage Plays (2011)
- Big Night (2017)

=== Novels ===
- Social disease. New York: Knopf. 1986.
- I'll take it : a novel. New York: Knopf. 1989.
- Gorgeous. New York: Scholastic. 2013.
- It's all your fault. New York: Scholastic. 2016.
- Playing the Palace. Berkley. 2021.
- Farrell Covington and the limits of style. Atria Books. 2023.
- What is wrong with you? Atria Books. 2025.
- The Tuxedo Society. Atria Books. 2026.

=== Memoirs ===
- I shudder : and other reactions to life, death, and New Jersey. Harper Collins. 2009.

=== Essays and reporting ===
- "A date with Nate". Shouts & Murmurs. The New Yorker. 88 (36): 49. November 19, 2012.
- "Cruise control". Shouts & Murmurs. The New Yorker. 88 (43): 31. January 14, 2013.
- "Wonderplanet". Shouts & Murmurs. The New Yorker. 89 (8): 38–39. April 8, 2013.
- "Most Gwyneth!". Shouts & Murmurs. The New Yorker. 89 (13): 32. May 13, 2013.
- "How many?". Shouts & Murmurs. The New Yorker. 89 (43): 29. January 6, 2014.
- "Yummy". Shouts & Murmurs. The New Yorker. 90 (15): 35. June 2, 2014.
- "Triggers". Shouts & Murmurs. The New Yorker. 90 (24): 29. August 25, 2014.
- "College-application essay". Shouts & Murmurs. The New Yorker. 90 (32): 42. October 20, 2014.
- "Your taxes". Shouts & Murmurs. The New Yorker. 90 (46): 29. February 2, 2015. (Note: Online version is titled "Taylor Swift and your taxes".)
- "Child spa". Shouts & Murmurs. The New Yorker. 91 (8): 33. April 13, 2015.
- "Mitt Romney's slumber-party diary". Shouts & Murmurs. The New Yorker. 91 (21): 29. July 27, 2015.
- "A special seder". Shouts & Murmurs. The New Yorker. 92 (11): 44. April 25, 2016.
- "Jared & Ivanka's guide to mindful marriage". Shouts & Murmurs. The New Yorker. 93 (17): 29. June 19, 2017.
- "Modern science". Shouts & Murmurs. The New Yorker. 93 (39): 31. December 4, 2017. (Note: Online version is titled "The Gaydar of Modern Science".)
- "Praise be : a letter from Trump's primary Evangelical adjunct". Shouts & Murmurs. The New Yorker. March 22, 2018. (Note: Available on website only.)
- "Neighborly". Shouts & Murmurs. The New Yorker. 100 (13): 27. May 20, 2024. (Note: Title in the online table of contents is "Neighborly cannibals".)

———————
