= 1st Tony Awards =

1947 US theatrical awards ceremony

- Date: April 6, 1947
- Location: Waldorf-Astoria Hotel, New York City, New York
- Hosted by: Brock Pemberton
- Most wins: Another Part of the Forest, Finian's Rainbow, and Happy Birthday (2)

Television/radio coverage
- Network: WOR (radio), Mutual Network (radio)

The First Tony Awards, more formally known as the Antoinette Perry Awards for Excellence in Theatre, were held on April 6, 1947, in the Grand Ballroom of the Waldorf-Astoria Hotel in New York City. Perry was a co-founder of the revived and revised version the American Theatre Wing (ATW) in 1940, and the award were established by the ATW in her memory after her death in 1946. Fellow ATW co-founder Louise Heims Beck was responsible for overseeing the organization of the 1st Tony Awards.

== Background and ceremony ==
Presented by the ATW, the Awards celebrated "outstanding contributions to the current American theatre season." According to The New York Times, these awards "do not designate their recipients as 'best' or 'first' but the classifications in which they are given will be elastic from year to year." The ceremony, hosted by Brock Pemberton, was broadcast on radio station WOR and the Mutual Network.

The awards got their nickname, "Tonys", during the ceremony itself when Pemberton handed out an award and called it a "Tony", referring to the nickname of Antoinette Perry, co-founder of the American Theatre Wing.

Musicals represented at the ceremony were Street Scene, Brigadoon and Finian's Rainbow. Oklahoma! and Carousel could not be nominated because, while although still playing their original runs at the time of the awards, they had opened too soon to qualify for the awards (Oklahoma! had opened in 1943, and Carousel in 1945).

The award itself was a scroll, an initialed sterling silver compact case for the women, and an engraved gold bill clip or cigarette lighter for the men.

== Winners ==
Note: nominees are not shown

=== Performance ===
Award	Winner (s)
Actors-Play	José Ferrer in Cyrano de Bergerac; Fredric March in Years Ago
Actresses-Play	Ingrid Bergman in Joan of Lorraine; Helen Hayes in Happy Birthday
Tony Award for Outstanding Newcomer	Patricia Neal in Another Part of the Forest
Tony Award for Best Performance in a Musical	David Wayne in Finian's Rainbow

=== Craft ===
Award	Winner
Director	Elia Kazan for All My Sons
Costume Designer	Lucinda Ballard for Happy Birthday, Another Part of the Forest, Street Scene, John Loves Mary, The Chocolate Soldier
Choreographers	Agnes de Mille for Brigadoon; Michael Kidd for Finian's Rainbow
Composer	Kurt Weill, Street Scene

=== Special awards ===
Source: The New York Times

- Dora Chamberlain - "unfailing courtesy as treasurer of the Martin Beck Theatre"
- Mr. and Mrs. Ira Katzenberg - "for enthusiasm as inveterate first-nighters"
- Jules Leventhal - "the season's most prolific backer and producer"
- P.A. MacDonald - "intricate construction for the production of 'If the Shoe Fits'"
- Burns Mantle - "for his annual publication"
- Arthur Miller - author of All My Sons
- Vincent Sardi Sr. - "for providing a transient home and comfort station for theatre folk at Sardi's for twenty years"

=== Multiple nominations and awards ===
The following productions received multiple awards.

- 2 wins: Another Part of the Forest, Finian's Rainbow and Happy Birthday

== See also ==
- 19th Academy Awards
