= Tony Award for Best Costume Design =

American theatre award

- Awarded for: Best Costume Design
- Location: United States New York City
- Presented by: American Theatre Wing The Broadway League
- Currently held by: Susan Hilferty for Wicked (2004)
- Website: TonyAwards.com

These are the winners and nominees for the Tony Award for Best Costume Design. The award was first presented in 1947 and included both plays and musicals. In 1961, and since 2005 the category was divided into Costume Design in a Play and Costume Design in a Musical with each genre receiving its own award.

== Winners and nominees ==
indicates the winner

=== 1940s ===
Year	Designer	Production
1947; 1st Tony Awards
1947; 1st Tony Awards	Lucinda Ballard	Another Part of the Forest, The Chocolate Soldier, Happy Birthday, John Loves Mary and Street Scene
1948; 2nd Tony Awards
1948; 2nd Tony Awards	Mary Percy Schenck	The Heiress
1949; 3rd Tony Awards
1949; 3rd Tony Awards	Lemuel Ayers	Kiss Me, Kate

=== 1950s ===
Year	Designer	Production
1950; 4th Tony Awards
1950; 4th Tony Awards	Aline Bernstein	Regina
1951; 5th Tony Awards
1951; 5th Tony Awards	Miles White	Bless You All
1952; 6th Tony Awards
1952; 6th Tony Awards	Irene Sharaff	The King and I
1953; 7th Tony Awards
1953; 7th Tony Awards	Miles White	Hazel Flagg
1954; 8th Tony Awards
1954; 8th Tony Awards	Richard Whorf	Ondine
1955; 9th Tony Awards
1955; 9th Tony Awards	Cecil Beaton	Quadrille
1956; 10th Tony Awards
1956; 10th Tony Awards	Alvin Colt	Pipe Dream
1956; 10th Tony Awards	Alvin Colt	The Lark and Phoenix '55
1956; 10th Tony Awards	Mainbocher	The Great Sebastians
1956; 10th Tony Awards	Helene Pons	A View from the Bridge, The Diary of Anne Frank and The Heavenly Twins
1957; 11th Tony Awards
1957; 11th Tony Awards	Cecil Beaton	My Fair Lady
1957; 11th Tony Awards	Cecil Beaton	Little Glass Clock
1957; 11th Tony Awards	Alvin Colt	Li'l Abner and The Sleeping Prince
1957; 11th Tony Awards	Dorothy Jeakins	Major Barbara and Too Late the Phalarope
1957; 11th Tony Awards	Irene Sharaff	Candide, Happy Hunting, Shangri La and Small War on Murray Hill
1958; 12th Tony Awards
1958; 12th Tony Awards	Motley Theatre Design Group	The First Gentleman
1958; 12th Tony Awards	Lucinda Ballard	Orpheus Descending
1958; 12th Tony Awards	Motley Theatre Design Group	The Country Wife, Look Back in Anger, Look Homeward, Angel and Shinbone Alley
1958; 12th Tony Awards	Irene Sharaff	West Side Story
1958; 12th Tony Awards	Miles White	Jamaica, Oh, Captain! and Time Remembered
1959; 13th Tony Awards
1959; 13th Tony Awards	Rouben Ter-Arutunian	Redhead
1959; 13th Tony Awards	Antonio Castillo	Goldilocks
1959; 13th Tony Awards	Dorothy Jeakins	The World of Suzie Wong
1959; 13th Tony Awards	Oliver Messel	Rashomon
1959; 13th Tony Awards	Irene Sharaff	Flower Drum Song

=== 1960s ===
Year	Designer	Production
1960; 14th Tony Awards
1960; 14th Tony Awards	Cecil Beaton	Saratoga
1960; 14th Tony Awards	Alvin Colt	Greenwillow
1960; 14th Tony Awards	Raoul Pene Du Bois	Gypsy
1960; 14th Tony Awards	Miles White	Take Me Along
1961; 15th Tony Awards	—N/a	
1962; 16th Tony Awards
1962; 16th Tony Awards	Lucinda Ballard	The Gay Life
1962; 16th Tony Awards	Donald Brooks	No Strings
1962; 16th Tony Awards	Motley Theatre Design Group	Kwamina
1962; 16th Tony Awards	Miles White	Milk and Honey
1963; 17th Tony Awards
1963; 17th Tony Awards	Anthony Powell	The School for Scandal
1963; 17th Tony Awards	Marcel Escoffier	The Lady of the Camellias
1963; 17th Tony Awards	Robert Fletcher	Little Me
1963; 17th Tony Awards	Motley Theatre Design Group	Mother Courage and Her Children
1964; 18th Tony Awards
1964; 18th Tony Awards	Freddy Wittop	Hello, Dolly!
1964; 18th Tony Awards	Beni Montresor	Marco Millions
1964; 18th Tony Awards	Irene Sharaff	The Girl Who Came to Supper
1964; 18th Tony Awards	Rouben Ter-Arutunian	Arturo Ui
1965; 19th Tony Awards
1965; 19th Tony Awards	Patricia Zipprodt	Fiddler on the Roof
1965; 19th Tony Awards	Jane Greenwood	Tartuffe
1965; 19th Tony Awards	Motley Theatre Design Group	Baker Street
1965; 19th Tony Awards	Freddy Wittop	The Roar of the Greasepaint – The Smell of the Crowd
1966; 20th Tony Awards
1966; 20th Tony Awards	Gunilla Palmstierna-Weiss	Marat/Sade
1966; 20th Tony Awards	Howard Bay and Patton Campbell	Man of La Mancha
1966; 20th Tony Awards	Loudon Sainthill	The Right Honourable Gentleman
1966; 20th Tony Awards	Irene Sharaff	Sweet Charity
1967; 21st Tony Awards
1967; 21st Tony Awards	Patricia Zipprodt	Cabaret
1967; 21st Tony Awards	Nancy Potts	The School for Scandal and The Wild Duck
1967; 21st Tony Awards	Tony Walton	The Apple Tree
1967; 21st Tony Awards	Freddy Wittop	I Do! I Do!
1968; 22nd Tony Awards
1968; 22nd Tony Awards	Desmond Heeley	Rosencrantz and Guildenstern Are Dead
1968; 22nd Tony Awards	Jane Greenwood	More Stately Mansions
1968; 22nd Tony Awards	Irene Sharaff	Hallelujah, Baby!
1968; 22nd Tony Awards	Freddy Wittop	The Happy Time
1969; 23rd Tony Awards
1969; 23rd Tony Awards	Loudon Sainthill	Canterbury Tales
1969; 23rd Tony Awards	Michael Annals	Morning, Noon and Night
1969; 23rd Tony Awards	Robert Fletcher	Hadrian VII
1969; 23rd Tony Awards	Patricia Zipprodt	Zorba

=== 1970s ===
Year	Designer	Production
1970; 24th Tony Awards
1970; 24th Tony Awards	Cecil Beaton	Coco
1970; 24th Tony Awards	Ray Aghayan	Applause
1970; 24th Tony Awards	W. Robert Lavine	Jimmy
1970; 24th Tony Awards	Freddy Wittop	A Patriot for Me
1971; 25th Tony Awards
1971; 25th Tony Awards	Raoul Pene Du Bois	No, No, Nanette
1971; 25th Tony Awards	Jane Greenwood	Hay Fever and Les Blancs
1971; 25th Tony Awards	Freddy Wittop	Lovely Ladies, Kind Gentlemen
1972; 26th Tony Awards
1972; 26th Tony Awards	Florence Klotz	Follies
1972; 26th Tony Awards	Theoni V. Aldredge	Two Gentlemen of Verona
1972; 26th Tony Awards	Randy Barceló	Jesus Christ Superstar
1972; 26th Tony Awards	Carrie F. Robbins	Grease
1973; 27th Tony Awards
1973; 27th Tony Awards	Florence Klotz	A Little Night Music
1973; 27th Tony Awards	Theoni V. Aldredge	Much Ado About Nothing
1973; 27th Tony Awards	Miles White	Tricks
1973; 27th Tony Awards	Patricia Zipprodt	Pippin
1974; 28th Tony Awards
1974; 28th Tony Awards	Franne Lee	Candide
1974; 28th Tony Awards	Theoni V. Aldredge	The Au Pair Man
1974; 28th Tony Awards	Finlay James	Crown Matrimonial
1974; 28th Tony Awards	Oliver Messel	Gigi
1974; 28th Tony Awards	Carrie F. Robbins	Over Here!
1975; 29th Tony Awards
1975; 29th Tony Awards	Geoffrey Holder	The Wiz
1975; 29th Tony Awards	Arthur Boccia	Where's Charley?
1975; 29th Tony Awards	Raoul Pene Du Bois	Doctor Jazz
1975; 29th Tony Awards	Willa Kim	Goodtime Charley
1975; 29th Tony Awards	Tanya Moiseiwitsch	The Misanthrope
1975; 29th Tony Awards	Patricia Zipprodt	Mack and Mabel
1976; 30th Tony Awards
1976; 30th Tony Awards	Florence Klotz	Pacific Overtures
1976; 30th Tony Awards	Theoni V. Aldredge	A Chorus Line
1976; 30th Tony Awards	Ann Roth	The Royal Family
1976; 30th Tony Awards	Patricia Zipprodt	Chicago
1977; 31st Tony Awards
1977; 31st Tony Awards	Theoni V. Aldredge	Annie
1977; 31st Tony Awards	Santo Loquasto	The Cherry Orchard
1977; 31st Tony Awards	Theoni V. Aldredge	The Threepenny Opera
1977; 31st Tony Awards	Nancy Potts	Porgy and Bess
1978; 32nd Tony Awards
1978; 32nd Tony Awards	Edward Gorey	Dracula
1978; 32nd Tony Awards	Halston	The Act
1978; 32nd Tony Awards	Geoffrey Holder	Timbuktu!
1978; 32nd Tony Awards	Willa Kim	Dancin'
1979; 33rd Tony Awards
1979; 33rd Tony Awards	Franne Lee	Sweeney Todd: The Demon Barber of Fleet Street
1979; 33rd Tony Awards	Theoni V. Aldredge	Ballroom
1979; 33rd Tony Awards	Ann Roth	The Crucifer of Blood
1979; 33rd Tony Awards	Julie Weiss	The Elephant Man

=== 1980s ===
Year	Designer	Production
1980; 34th Tony Awards
1980; 34th Tony Awards	Theoni V. Aldredge	Barnum
1980; 34th Tony Awards	Pierre Balmain	Happy New Year
1980; 34th Tony Awards	Raoul Pene Du Bois	Sugar Babies
1980; 34th Tony Awards	Tazeena Firth and Timothy O'Brien	Evita
1981; 35th Tony Awards
1981; 35th Tony Awards	Willa Kim	Sophisticated Ladies
1981; 35th Tony Awards	Theoni V. Aldredge	42nd Street
1981; 35th Tony Awards	John Bury	Amadeus
1981; 35th Tony Awards	Franca Squarciapino	Can-Can
1982; 36th Tony Awards
1982; 36th Tony Awards	William Ivey Long	Nine
1982; 36th Tony Awards	Theoni V. Aldredge	Dreamgirls
1982; 36th Tony Awards	Jane Greenwood	Medea
1982; 36th Tony Awards	John Napier	The Life and Adventures of Nicholas Nickleby
1983; 37th Tony Awards
1983; 37th Tony Awards	John Napier	Cats
1983; 37th Tony Awards	Lindy Hemming	All's Well That Ends Well
1983; 37th Tony Awards	Rita Ryack	My One and Only
1983; 37th Tony Awards	Patricia Zipprodt	Alice in Wonderland
1984; 38th Tony Awards
1984; 38th Tony Awards	Theoni V. Aldredge	La Cage aux Folles
1984; 38th Tony Awards	Jane Greenwood	Heartbreak House
1984; 38th Tony Awards	Ann Hould-Ward and Patricia Zipprodt	Sunday in the Park with George
1984; 38th Tony Awards	Anthea Sylbert	The Real Thing
1985; 39th Tony Awards
1985; 39th Tony Awards	Florence Klotz	Grind
1985; 39th Tony Awards	Patricia McGourty	Big River
1985; 39th Tony Awards	Alexander Reid	Cyrano de Bergerac
1985; 39th Tony Awards	Alexander Reid	Much Ado About Nothing
1986; 40th Tony Awards
1986; 40th Tony Awards	Patricia Zipprodt	Sweet Charity
1986; 40th Tony Awards	Willa Kim	Song and Dance
1986; 40th Tony Awards	Beni Montresor	The Marriage of Figaro
1986; 40th Tony Awards	Ann Roth	The House of Blue Leaves
1987; 41st Tony Awards
1987; 41st Tony Awards	John Napier	Starlight Express
1987; 41st Tony Awards	Bob Crowley	Les Liaisons Dangereuses
1987; 41st Tony Awards	Ann Curtis	Me and My Girl
1987; 41st Tony Awards	Andreane Neofitou	Les Misérables
1988; 42nd Tony Awards
1988; 42nd Tony Awards	Maria Björnson	The Phantom of the Opera
1988; 42nd Tony Awards	Ann Hould-Ward	Into the Woods
1988; 42nd Tony Awards	Eiko Ishioka	M. Butterfly
1988; 42nd Tony Awards	Tony Walton	Anything Goes
1989; 43rd Tony Awards
1989; 43rd Tony Awards	Héctor Orezzoli and Claudio Segovia	Black and Blue
1989; 43rd Tony Awards	Jane Greenwood	Our Town
1989; 43rd Tony Awards	Willa Kim	Legs Diamond
1989; 43rd Tony Awards	William Ivey Long	Lend Me a Tenor

=== 1990s ===
Year	Designer	Production
1990; 44th Tony Awards
1990; 44th Tony Awards	Santo Loquasto	Grand Hotel
1990; 44th Tony Awards	Theoni V. Aldredge	Gypsy
1990; 44th Tony Awards	Florence Klotz	City of Angels
1990; 44th Tony Awards	Erin Quigley	The Grapes of Wrath
1991; 45th Tony Awards
1991; 45th Tony Awards	Willa Kim	The Will Rogers Follies
1991; 45th Tony Awards	Theoni V. Aldredge	The Secret Garden
1991; 45th Tony Awards	Judy Dearing	Once on This Island
1991; 45th Tony Awards	Patricia Zipprodt	Shōgun: The Musical
1992; 46th Tony Awards
1992; 46th Tony Awards	William Ivey Long	Crazy for You
1992; 46th Tony Awards	Jane Greenwood	Two Shakespearean Actors
1992; 46th Tony Awards	Toni-Leslie James	Jelly's Last Jam
1992; 46th Tony Awards	Joe Vaněk	Dancing at Lughnasa
1993; 47th Tony Awards
1993; 47th Tony Awards	Florence Klotz	Kiss of the Spider Woman
1993; 47th Tony Awards	Jane Greenwood	The Sisters Rosensweig
1993; 47th Tony Awards	Erin Quigley	The Song of Jacob Zulu
1993; 47th Tony Awards	David C. Woolard	The Who's Tommy
1994; 48th Tony Awards
1994; 48th Tony Awards	Ann Hould-Ward	Beauty and the Beast
1994; 48th Tony Awards	David Charles and Jane Greenwood	She Loves Me
1994; 48th Tony Awards	Jane Greenwood	Passion
1994; 48th Tony Awards	Yan Tax	Cyrano: The Musical
1995; 49th Tony Awards
1995; 49th Tony Awards	Florence Klotz	Show Boat
1995; 49th Tony Awards	Jane Greenwood	The Heiress
1995; 49th Tony Awards	Stephen Brimson Lewis	Indiscretions
1995; 49th Tony Awards	Anthony Powell	Sunset Boulevard
1996; 50th Tony Awards
1996; 50th Tony Awards	Roger Kirk	The King and I
1996; 50th Tony Awards	Jane Greenwood	A Delicate Balance
1996; 50th Tony Awards	Allison Reeds	Buried Child
1996; 50th Tony Awards	Paul Tazewell	Bring in 'da Noise/Bring in 'da Funk
1997; 51st Tony Awards
1997; 51st Tony Awards	Judith Dolan	Candide
1997; 51st Tony Awards	Ann Curtis	Jekyll and Hyde
1997; 51st Tony Awards	William Ivey Long	Chicago
1997; 51st Tony Awards	Martin Pakledinaz	The Life
1998; 52nd Tony Awards
1998; 52nd Tony Awards	Julie Taymor	The Lion King
1998; 52nd Tony Awards	William Ivey Long	Cabaret
1998; 52nd Tony Awards	Santo Loquasto	Ragtime
1998; 52nd Tony Awards	Martin Pakledinaz	Golden Child
1999; 53rd Tony Awards
1999; 53rd Tony Awards	Lez Brotherston	Swan Lake
1999; 53rd Tony Awards	Santo Loquasto	Fosse
1999; 53rd Tony Awards	John David Ridge	Ring Round the Moon
1999; 53rd Tony Awards	Catherine Zuber	Twelfth Night

=== 2000s ===
Year	Designer	Production
2000; 54th Tony Awards
2000; 54th Tony Awards	Martin Pakledinaz	Kiss Me, Kate
2000; 54th Tony Awards	Bob Crowley	Aida
2000; 54th Tony Awards	Constance Hoffman	The Green Bird
2000; 54th Tony Awards	William Ivey Long	The Music Man
2001; 55th Tony Awards
2001; 55th Tony Awards	William Ivey Long	The Producers
2001; 55th Tony Awards	Theoni V. Aldredge	Follies
2001; 55th Tony Awards	Roger Kirk	42nd Street
2001; 55th Tony Awards	David C. Woolard	The Rocky Horror Show
2002; 56th Tony Awards
2002; 56th Tony Awards	Martin Pakledinaz	Thoroughly Modern Millie
2002; 56th Tony Awards	Jenny Beavan	Private Lives
2002; 56th Tony Awards	Susan Hilferty	Into the Woods
2002; 56th Tony Awards	Jane Greenwood	Morning's at Seven
2003; 57th Tony Awards
2003; 57th Tony Awards	William Ivey Long	Hairspray
2003; 57th Tony Awards	Gregg Barnes	Flower Drum Song
2003; 57th Tony Awards	Catherine Martin and Angus Strathie	La bohème
2003; 57th Tony Awards	Catherine Zuber	Dinner at Eight
2004; 58th Tony Awards
2004; 58th Tony Awards	Susan Hilferty	Wicked
2004; 58th Tony Awards	Jess Goldstein	Henry IV, Part 1 and Part 2
2004; 58th Tony Awards	Mike Nicholls and Bobby Pearce	Taboo
2004; 58th Tony Awards	Mark Thompson	Bombay Dreams

== Award Records ==
These include wins for the Best Costume Design in a Play and Best Costume Design in a Musical.

=== Multiple wins ===
6 Wins

- Florence Klotz
- William Ivey Long

4 Wins

- Cecil Beaton

3 Wins

- Theoni V. Aldredge
- Eugene Lee
- Santo Loquasto
- Patricia Zipprodt
- Catherine Zuber

2 Wins

- Lucinda Ballard
- Gregg Barnes
- Linda Cho
- Desmond Heeley
- Rob Howell
- Willa Kim
- Franne Lee
- Katrina Lindsay
- Motley Theatre Design Group
- John Napier
- Martin Pakledinaz

== See also ==
- Tony Award for Best Costume Design in a Musical
- Tony Award for Best Costume Design in a Play
- Drama Desk Award for Outstanding Costume Design
- Laurence Olivier Award for Best Costume Design
- List of Tony Award-nominated productions
