= 23rd Tony Awards =

1969 US theatrical awards ceremony

- Date: April 20, 1969
- Location: Mark Hellinger Theatre, New York City, New York
- Hosted by: Diahann Carroll and Alan King
- Most wins: The Great White Hope and 1776 (3)
- Most nominations: Promises, Promises and Zorba (8)

Television/radio coverage
- Network: NBC

The 23rd Annual Tony Awards was broadcast by NBC television on April 20, 1969, from the Mark Hellinger Theatre in New York City. Hosts were Diahann Carroll and Alan King.

== Eligibility ==
Shows that opened on Broadway during the 1968–1969 season before March 19, 1969 are eligible.

Original plays

- The American Dream
- Blueprints: Projections and Perspectives
- Box
- But, Seriously...
- A Cry of Players
- The Cuban Thing
- The Death of Bessie Smith
- Does a Tiger Wear a Necktie?
- The Dozens
- The Exercise
- Fire!
- The Flip Side
- Forty Carats
- Gianni Schicchi
- The Goodbye People
- The Great White Hope
- Hadrian the Seventh
- Happy Days
- Happiness Is Just a Little Thing Called a Rolls Royce
- The House of Atreus
- In the Matter of J. Robert Oppenheimer
- Jimmy Shine
- Krapp's Last Tape
- Leda Had a Little Swan
- Lovers
- Lovers and Other Strangers
- The Man in the Glass Booth
- Mike Downstairs
- Morning, Noon and Night
- The Mother Lover
- The Only Game in Town
- Play It Again, Sam
- Quotations From Chairman Mao Tse-Tung
- Red, White and Maddox
- Rockefeller and the Red Indians
- The Seven Descents of Myrtle
- Soldiers
- The Sudden & Accidental Re-Education of Horse Johnson
- The Tale of Kasane
- The Three Musketeers
- The Venetian Twins
- The Watering Place
- A Way of Life
- We Bombed in New Haven
- Woman Is My Idea
- The Wrong Way Light Bulb
- Zelda
- The Zoo Story

Original musicals

- Canterbury Tales
- Celebration
- Come Summer
- Dear World
- The Fig Leaves Are Falling
- George M!
- Hair
- Her First Roman
- I'm Solomon
- Leonard Sillman's New Faces of 1968
- Maggie Flynn
- The Megilla of Itzik Manger
- Noël Coward's Sweet Potato
- Promises, Promises
- 1776
- Zorba

Play revivals

- Arturo Ui
- Cock-a-Doodle Dandy
- The Cocktail Party
- The Critic
- Cyrano de Bergerac
- George Dandin
- Hamlet
- King Lear
- The Misanthrope
- On The Harmfulness of Tobacco
- Tartuffe
- Tyger! Tyger! and other burnings

== The ceremony ==
Presenters: Lauren Bacall, Pearl Bailey, Harry Belafonte, Richard Benjamin, Godfrey Cambridge, Betty Comden, Patty Duke, Adolph Green, Dustin Hoffman, Angela Lansbury, Jack Lemmon, Ethel Merman, Arthur Miller, Robert Morse, Zero Mostel, Paula Prentiss, Robert Preston, Vanessa Redgrave, Leslie Uggams, Gwen Verdon, Shelley Winters.

Musicals represented:

- Zorba ("Life Is" - Lorraine Serabian and Company)
- Promises, Promises ("She Likes Basketball"/"Turkey Lurkey Time" - Jerry Orbach, Donna McKechnie and Company)
- 1776 ("Momma, Look Sharp" - Scott Jarvis, William Duell, B.J. Slater)
- Hair ("Three-Five-Zero-Zero"/Let The Sun Shine In" - Company)

Scenes from plays were presented for the first time. Plays represented were:

- Lovers (Scene with Art Carney and Anna Mannahan)
- The Great White Hope (Scene with James Earl Jones and Jane Alexander)

== Winners and nominees ==
Winners are in bold

Best Play	Best Musical
**The Great White Hope – Howard Sackler**; Hadrian the Seventh – Peter Luke; Lovers – Brian Friel; The Man in the Glass Booth – Robert Shaw	**1776**; Hair; Promises, Promises; Zorba
Best Performance by a Leading Actor in a Play	Best Performance by a Leading Actress in a Play
**James Earl Jones – The Great White Hope as Jack Jefferson**; Art Carney – Lovers as Andy Tracey; Alec McCowen – Hadrian the Seventh as Fr. William Rolfe; Donald Pleasence – The Man in the Glass Booth as Arthur Goldman	**Julie Harris – Forty Carats as Ann Stanley**; Estelle Parsons – The Seven Descents of Myrtle as Myrtle; Charlotte Rae – Morning, Noon and Night as Various Characters; Brenda Vaccaro – The Goodbye People as Nancy Scott
Best Performance by a Leading Actor in a Musical	Best Performance by a Leading Actress in a Musical
**Jerry Orbach – Promises, Promises as Chuck Baxter**; Herschel Bernardi – Zorba as Zorba; Jack Cassidy – Maggie Flynn as The Clown; Joel Grey – George M! as George M. Cohan	**Angela Lansbury – Dear World as Countess Aurelia**; Maria Karnilova – Zorba as Madame Hortense; Dorothy Loudon – The Fig Leaves Are Falling as Lillian Stone; Jill O'Hara – Promises, Promises as Fran Kubelik
Best Performance by a Supporting or Featured Actor in a Play	Best Performance by a Supporting or Featured Actress in a Play
**Al Pacino – Does a Tiger Wear a Necktie? as Bickham**; Richard Castellano – Lovers and Other Strangers as Frank; Tony Roberts – Play It Again Sam as Dick Christie; Louis Zorich – Hadrian the Seventh as Cardinal Ragna	**Jane Alexander – The Great White Hope as Eleanor Bachman**; Diane Keaton – Play It Again Sam as Linda Christie; Lauren Jones – Does a Tiger Wear a Necktie? as Linda; Anna Manahan – Lovers as Hanna
Best Performance by a Supporting or Featured Actor in a Musical	Best Performance by a Supporting or Featured Actress in a Musical
**Ronald Holgate – 1776 as Richard Henry Lee**; Larry Haines – Promises, Promises as Dr. Dreyfuss; Edward Winter – Promises, Promises as J.D. Sheldrake; William Daniels – 1776 as John Adams (refused nomination)	**Marian Mercer – Promises, Promises as Marge MacDougall**; Sandy Duncan – Canterbury Tales as Various Characters; Lorraine Serabian – Zorba as Leader; Virginia Vestoff – 1776 as Abigail Adams
Best Direction of a Play	Best Direction of a Musical
**Peter Dews – Hadrian the Seventh**; Joseph Hardy – Play It Again Sam; Harold Pinter – The Man in the Glass Booth; Michael A. Schultz – Does a Tiger Wear a Necktie?	**Peter Hunt – 1776**; Robert Moore – Promises, Promises; Tom O'Horgan – Hair; Harold Prince – Zorba
Best Choreography	Best Scenic Design
**Joe Layton – George M!**; Sammy Bayes – Canterbury Tales; Ron Field – Zorba; Michael Bennett – Promises, Promises	**Boris Aronson – Zorba**; Derek Cousins – Canterbury Tales; Jo Mielziner – 1776; Oliver Smith – Dear World
Best Costume Design
**Loudon Sainthill – Canterbury Tales**; Michael Annals – Morning, Noon and Night; Robert Fletcher – Hadrian the Seventh; Patricia Zipprodt – Zorba

== Special awards ==
- The National Theatre Company of Great Britain (accepted by artistic director Sir Laurence Olivier)
- The Negro Ensemble Company
- Rex Harrison
- Leonard Bernstein
- Carol Burnett

=== Multiple nominations and awards ===
These productions had multiple nominations:

- 8 nominations: Promises, Promises and Zorba
- 6 nominations: 1776
- 5 nominations: Hadrian the Seventh
- 4 nominations: Canterbury Tales
- 3 nominations: Does a Tiger Wear a Necktie?, The Great White Hope, Lovers, The Man in the Glass Booth and Play It Again Sam
- 2 nominations: Dear World, George M!, Hair and Morning, Noon and Night

The following productions received multiple awards.

- 3 wins: The Great White Hope and 1776
- 2 wins: Promises, Promises

== See also ==
- 41st Academy Awards
