= Dora Chamberlain =

Martin Beck Theatre treasurer

- Born: Dora Marie Chamberlain; 1928
- Died: July 5, 2016 (aged 87); Bluewater Health
- Occupation: Treasurer
- Spouse: Edmond Chamberlain
- Children: Sharon Sugden

Dora Marie Chamberlain (1928 – 5 July 2016) was the Martin Beck Theatre treasurer.

She won the Special Tony Award in the 1947 edition, along Mr. and Mrs. Ira Katzenberg, Jules Leventhal, P.A. MacDonald, Burns Mantle, Arthur Miller and Vincent Sardi Sr. She died in Bluewater Health on 5 July 2016 at aged 87.
