= 26th Tony Awards =

1972 US theatrical awards ceremony

- Date: April 23, 1972
- Location: The Broadway Theatre, New York City, New York
- Hosted by: Henry Fonda, Deborah Kerr and Peter Ustinov
- Most wins: Follies (7)
- Most nominations: Follies (11)

Television/radio coverage
- Network: ABC

The 26th Annual Tony Awards was broadcast by ABC television on April 23, 1972, from The Broadway Theatre in New York City. Hosts were Henry Fonda, Deborah Kerr and Peter Ustinov.

== Eligibility ==
Shows that opened on Broadway during the 1971–1972 season before March 31, 1972 are eligible.

Original plays

- All Over
- Children! Children!
- The Dance of Death
- Defender of the Faith
- Double Solitaire
- Eli, the Fanatic
- Epstein
- Fun City
- How the Other Half Loves
- The Incomparable Max
- Lenny
- The Love Suicide at Schofield Barracks
- Ovid's Metamorphoses
- Moonchildren
- Murderous Angels
- Narrow Road to the Deep North
- Night Watch
- Old Times
- The Prisoner of Second Avenue
- Scratch
- Solitaire
- Sticks and Bones
- There's One in Every Marriage
- The Trial of the Catonsville Nine
- Twigs
- Vivat! Vivat Regina!
- Wise Child

Original musicals

- Ain't Supposed to Die a Natural Death
- Earl of Ruston
- Follies
- Frank Merriwell
- The Grass Harp
- Grease
- Inner City
- Jesus Christ Superstar
- Only Fools Are Sad
- The Selling of the President
- 70, Girls, 70
- To Live Another Summer, To Pass Another Winter
- Two Gentlemen of Verona
- Wild and Wonderful
- You're a Good Man, Charlie Brown

Play revivals

- Antigone
- The Country Girl
- Mary Stuart
- No Place to Be Somebody
- The Sign in Sidney Brustein's Window
- Twelfth Night

Musical revivals

- A Funny Thing Happened on the Way to the Forum
- Johnny Johnson
- On the Town

== The ceremony ==
Presenters were Richard Benjamin, Ingrid Bergman, Claire Bloom, Arlene Dahl, Sandy Duncan, Peter Falk, Lee Grant, Joel Grey, Arthur Hill, Hal Holbrook, Jean Stapleton, and Gwen Verdon.

Performers were Desi Arnaz, Janet Blair, Larry Blyden, Alfred Drake, Helen Gallagher, Lisa Kirk, Hal Linden, Barbara McNair, Ethel Merman, and Constance Towers.

Musicals represented:

- Ain't Supposed to Die a Natural Death ("Put a Curse on You" - Company)
- Jesus Christ Superstar (Medley - Jeff Fenholt, Yvonne Elliman and Company)
- No, No, Nanette ("You Can Dance With Any Girl" - Helen Gallagher and Bobby Van / "I Want to Be Happy" - Ruby Keeler and Company)

Special Tony Awards were presented to Ethel Merman and Richard Rodgers. For Rodgers, there was a medley from his works, from Garrick Gaieties to Do I Hear A Waltz, with the composer accepting his award to the tune of "The Sound of Music." With the assistance of Hal Linden and Larry Blyden, Merman herself sang selections from her performances, including "I Got Rhythm" and "Everything's Comin' Up Roses."

== Winners and nominees ==
Winners are in bold

Best Play	Best Musical
**Sticks and Bones – David Rabe**; Old Times – Harold Pinter; The Prisoner of Second Avenue – Neil Simon; Vivat! Vivat Regina! – Robert Bolt	**Two Gentlemen of Verona**; Ain't Supposed to Die a Natural Death; Follies; Grease
Best Book of a Musical	Best Original Score (Music and/or Lyrics) Written for the Theatre
**John Guare and Mel Shapiro – Two Gentlemen of Verona**; Melvin Van Peebles – Ain't Supposed to Die a Natural Death; James Goldman – Follies; Jim Jacobs and Warren Casey – Grease	**Follies – Stephen Sondheim (music and lyrics)**; Ain't Supposed to Die a Natural Death – Melvin Van Peebles (music and lyrics); Jesus Christ Superstar – Andrew Lloyd Webber (music) and Tim Rice (lyrics); Two Gentlemen of Verona – Galt MacDermot (music) and John Guare (lyrics)
Best Performance by a Leading Actor in a Play	Best Performance by a Leading Actress in a Play
**Cliff Gorman – Lenny as Lenny Bruce**; Tom Aldredge – Sticks and Bones as Ozzie; Donald Pleasence – Wise Child as Mrs. Artminster; Jason Robards – The Country Girl as Frank Elgin	**Sada Thompson – Twigs as Various Characters**; Eileen Atkins – Vivat! Vivat Regina! as Elizabeth I; Colleen Dewhurst – All Over as The Mistress; Rosemary Harris – Old Times as Anna
Best Performance by a Leading Actor in a Musical	Best Performance by a Leading Actress in a Musical
**Phil Silvers – A Funny Thing Happened on the Way to the Forum as Pseudolus**; Clifton Davis – Two Gentlemen of Verona as Valentine; Barry Bostwick – Grease as Danny Zuko; Raúl Juliá – Two Gentleman of Verona as Proteus	**Alexis Smith – Follies as Phyllis Rogers Stone**; Jonelle Allen – Two Gentlemen of Verona as Silvia; Dorothy Collins – Follies as Sally Durant Plummer; Mildred Natwick – 70, Girls, 70 as Ida Dodd
Best Performance by a Supporting or Featured Actor in a Play	Best Performance by a Supporting or Featured Actress in a Play
**Vincent Gardenia – The Prisoner of Second Avenue as Harry Edison**; Douglas Rain – Vivat! Vivat Regina! as William Cecil; Lee Richardson – Vivat! Vivat Regina! as Lord Bothwell; Joe Silver – Lenny as Various Characters	**Elizabeth Wilson – Sticks and Bones as Harriet**; Cara Duff-MacCormick – Moonchildren as Shelly; Mercedes McCambridge – The Love Suicide at Schofield Barracks as Lucy Lake; Frances Sternhagen – The Sign in Sidney Brustein's Window as Mavis Parodus Bryson
Best Performance by a Supporting or Featured Actor in a Musical	Best Performance by a Supporting or Featured Actress in a Musical
**Larry Blyden – A Funny Thing Happened on the Way to the Forum as Hysterium**; Timothy Meyers – Grease as Kenickie; Gene Nelson – Follies as Buddy Plummer; Ben Vereen – Jesus Christ Superstar as Judas Iscariot	**Linda Hopkins – Inner City as Various Characters**; Adrienne Barbeau – Grease as Betty Rizzo; Bernadette Peters – On the Town as Hildy Esterhazy; Beatrice Winde – Ain't Supposed to Die a Natural Death as Various Characters
Best Direction of a Play	Best Direction of a Musical
**Mike Nichols – The Prisoner of Second Avenue**; Jeff Bleckner – Sticks and Bones; Gordon Davidson – The Trial of the Catonsville Nine; Peter Hall – Old Times	**Harold Prince and Michael Bennett – Follies**; Gilbert Moses – Ain't Supposed to Die a Natural Death; Mel Shapiro – Two Gentlemen of Verona; Burt Shevelove – A Funny Thing Happened on the Way to the Forum
Best Choreography	Best Scenic Design
**Michael Bennett – Follies**; Patricia Birch – Grease; Jean Erdman – Two Gentlemen of Verona	**Boris Aronson – Follies**; John Bury – Old Times; Kert Lundell – Ain't Supposed to Die a Natural Death; Robin Wagner – Jesus Christ Superstar
Best Costume Design	Best Lighting Design
**Florence Klotz – Follies**; Theoni V. Aldredge – Two Gentlemen of Verona; Randy Barceló – Jesus Christ Superstar; Carrie F. Robbins – Grease	**Tharon Musser – Follies**; Martin Aronstein – Ain't Supposed to Die a Natural Death; John Bury – Old Times; Jules Fisher – Jesus Christ Superstar

== Special awards ==
- The Theatre Guild—American Theatre Society, for its many years of service to audiences for touring shows.
- Fiddler on the Roof, on becoming the longest-running musical in Broadway history. Presented to Harold Prince.
- Ethel Merman
- Richard Rodgers

=== Multiple nominations and awards ===
These productions had multiple nominations:

- 11 nominations: Follies
- 9 nominations: Two Gentlemen of Verona
- 7 nominations: Ain't Supposed to Die a Natural Death and Grease
- 5 nominations: Jesus Christ Superstar and Old Times
- 4 nominations: Sticks and Bones and Vivat! Vivat Regina!
- 3 nominations: A Funny Thing Happened on the Way to the Forum and The Prisoner of Second Avenue
- 2 nominations: Lenny

The following productions received multiple awards.

- 7 wins: Follies
- 2 wins: A Funny Thing Happened on the Way to the Forum, The Prisoner of Second Avenue, Sticks and Bones and Two Gentlemen of Verona

== See also ==
- 44th Academy Awards
