= Tragedian (disambiguation) =

Tragedian refers to:

- A term for Greek playwrights who wrote tragedies. See Greek Tragedy.
- The name of the roving acting company in Tom Stoppard's Rosencrantz and Guildenstern Are Dead.
