= Ann Curtis (disambiguation) =

Ann Curtis (1926–2012), was an American swimmer.

Ann or Anne Curtis may also refer to:

- Ann Curtis (writer) known as Ann of Swansea
- Ann Curtis (costume designer)
- Anne Curtis (born 1985), Filipino actress and presenter
