= Lenny (play) =

1971 play by Julian Barry about comedian Lenny Bruce

- Written by: Julian Barry
- Music by: Tom O'Horgan
- Subject: Lenny Bruce
- Genre: Comedy-drama
- Setting: Act I: 1951-1961; Act II: 1962-1966

Premiere
- Directed by: Tom O'Horgan

Lenny is a 1971 play by Julian Barry about the life and career of American stand-up comedian Lenny Bruce. It opened on Broadway at the Brooks Atkinson Theatre on May 26, 1972; where it ran for 453 performances. Lead actor Cliff Gorman won a Tony Award and a Drama Desk Award for his portrayal of Bruce. The play was adapted into the 1974 film of the same name starring Dustin Hoffman.

The play's narrative is structured around controversial stand-up comedian Lenny Bruce's own nightclub routines, spanning from his early career in 1951 to his death from a drug overdose in 1966.

== Production history ==
=== 1971 Broadway production ===
While playwright Julian Barry and director Tom O'Horgan were working on a film about the life and career of Lenny Bruce for Columbia Pictures, the studio canceled the film. Barry and O'Horgan then decided to turn the film into a play. "The movie," said Barry, "was like a hip Jolson story. It was the story of a guy's life. The play is really the story of a guy's head. It's twice as free as the film."

The original Broadway production opened at the Brooks Atkinson Theatre on May 26, 1971, after 16 previews which began on May 10, 1971. O'Horgan directed and also wrote incidental music for the production. Set design was by Robin Wagner, costume design by Randy Barceló, with lighting design by Jules Fisher. The cast included Cliff Gorman as Lenny Bruce, Jane House as Rusty (Bruce's wife); along with Joe Silver, Erica Yohn, Paul Lieber, Melody Santangelo, and Robert Weil. Certain cast members doubled as musicians on-stage.

New York Times reviewer Hobart Taylor Jr. praised the production, writing: "[O'Horgan] has been very successful in capturing the pace and sleaziness of show business, and little night clubs, and bands that laugh and customers that don't ... [Gorman has] a fantastic gift for mimicry, an absolutely driven style that hammers and hammers home to the audience, relentless, mocking and acerbic. Mr. Gorman is on that stage for hours and hours and hours, facing the audience, belting the material, and also revealing the scalding anger of a man who didn't want to be misunderstood. This is a performance that cannot fail to make a major star out of Mr. Gorman—the man is a consummate actor. Guy Flatley wrote: "[Gorman] put himself in the running for next season's best actor awards with one giant stroke."

Despite positive reviews, reviewer Mel Gussow states: "At the premiere itself there were a few angry walkouts ..."

The production earned three Drama Desk Awards (Cliff Gorman, Robin Wagner, Tom O'Horgan) and two Tony Awards (Joe Silver, Cliff Gorman).

Although it was not a musical, an original cast album recording was made of the play. The recording contained the entire 1971 production recorded from a live performance. The album, released by Blue Thumb Records (BTS 9001), consisted of a double vinyl release, a 12-page booklet, a fold-out poster of Lenny Bruce, and a record sleeve with the image of the American flag. It would go on to win a Grammy Award for Best Spoken Word Recording.

=== 1999 London production ===
A production of Lenny opened at the Queen's Theatre on August 9, 1999 and ran until October 16, 1999; with previews starting on July 27, 1999. The play starred Eddie Izzard as Lenny, with Elizabeth Berkley as his wife, Rusty. The production was directed by Sir Peter Hall and produced by PW Productions. Other cast members included: David Ryall, Stephen Noonan, Sandra Caron, Matt Devereaux, James Hayes and Annette McLaughlin.

The Times reviewer, Charles Spencer, wrote of Izzard's performance: "... you never feel the actor is in tune with his character, and the frisson of danger that enlivened Bruce's performances is fatally absent." Benedict Nightingale wrote: "Some have claimed that Izzard's portrayal of the American comedian's life isn't abrasive enough. Those, however, who saw Bruce in action will know that Izzard has caught the essence of a man who was impishly subversive ..." Sunday Times Reviewer John Peter claimed: "Eddie Izzard's Lenny Bruce may bare all on stage, but we never quite get the naked truth."

Matt Wolf wrote in Variety: "If it's possible to be simultaneously miscast and mesmerizing, Eddie Izzard manages exactly that in "Lenny," ... none of the play's supporting cast - the leggy Rusty of Elizabeth Berkley, in an unexpected stage appearance, included – has much of an interest to act ..." August 16, 1999.

Plans to take the play to America were never realized.

== Awards ==
Award	Category	Nominee(s)	Result
Drama Desk Award	Outstanding Performance	Cliff Gorman	Won
Drama Desk Award	Outstanding Set Design	Robin Wagner	Won
Drama Desk Award	Outstanding Director	Tom O'Horgan	Won
Tony Awards	Best Featured Actor in a Play	Joe Silver	Nominated
Tony Awards	Best Actor in a Play	Cliff Gorman	Won
Grammy Awards	Best Spoken Word Recording	Bruce Botnick (producer)	Won

== Gloria Swanson reaction ==
Actress Gloria Swanson drew media attention for walking out on a performance of the play. During her October 29, 1971 appearance on The Dick Cavett Show, Cavett said to Swanson, "You walked out on something the other day ... on Lenny I believe." Swanson explained that she had been given tickets to the performance by the sister of the producer; and that she did not know what it was about: "I had never seen the man that it was fashioned after ... I do not read Variety." She further went on to say, "There's a time and a place for everything, and I don't think that kind of vulgarity should be on the stage."

In an interview with The New York Times, October 10, 1971, Swanson commented, "I'll walk out on anything that is crude and in bad taste. It's not the nudity; I've seen many nude bodies in the Folies Bergère with fig leaves and little things on the breasts. And it's not the four‐letter words. I've heard four‐letter words. They're as common as A‐B‐C. When Lenny [Cliff Gorman] comes home and opens his fly ... Why? I've been around. I've seen a lot. Why? The poor characters that do this are trying to get attention. You know, people who write this stuff do it COMPLETELY for shock, and to make money out of it. But everybody excuses it because Lenny Bruce [is] supposed to be a genius.”

== See also ==
- What Lenny Bruce. The New York Times. June 27, 1971.
- Cake or Death. Reviews: Eddie Izzard in Lenny. www.auntiemomo.com
