= Florence Klotz =

American costume designer (1920–2006)

- Born: Kathrina Klotz; October 28, 1920; Brooklyn, New York, U.S.
- Died: November 1, 2006 (aged 86); Manhattan, New York, U.S.
- Known for: Costume designer
- Awards: Tony Award for Best Costume Design

Florence Klotz (October 28, 1920 – November 1, 2006) was an American costume designer on Broadway and on film.

== Biography ==
Born in Brooklyn, New York, to parents who owned a millinery store, she graduated from Parsons School of Design, and went to work painting fabrics for Brooks Costumes, one of the best known theatre costume companies. In 1951, while working there she was approached by famed designer Irene Sharaff to assist her with the costumes for Richard Rodgers and Oscar Hammerstein II's The King and I. She subsequently worked for other leading designers including Lucinda Ballard and Raoul Pene Du Bois before embarking on designing for plays on her own in the 1960s. It was there she met her companion for the next half century Ruth Mitchell who later would co-produce Broadway shows with Hal Prince.

Klotz won the first of her six Tony Awards for costume design for the 1971 Stephen Sondheim musical Follies. In her Broadway career she worked on 58 Broadway shows, as an assistant on 26 and the designer on 32.

In addition she worked on opera and ballet, notably with Jerome Robbins, designing costumes for Madama Butterfly for the Lyric Opera of Chicago and the film version of A Little Night Music. She became friendly with actress Elizabeth Taylor on the set of this last venture, for which Klotz was nominated for an Academy Award — Taylor asked Klotz to design the lavender dress she wore for her wedding to United States Senator John Warner (R-VA) in 1976.

Other musicals she designed for included City of Angels, On the Twentieth Century, It's a Bird... It's a Plane... It's Superman, Grind, and The Little Foxes.

Originally named as Kathrina Klotz, she later changed her name to "Florence" and was often nicknamed "Flossie".

== Costume design ==
Klotz designed costumes for many Broadway productions, including:

- Kiss of the Spider Woman
- City of Angels
- Jerry's Girls
- On the Twentieth Century
- Side by Side by Sondheim
- Pacific Overtures
- A Little Night Music
- Follies
- It's a Bird... It's a Plane... It's Superman
- The Best Laid Plans
- The Owl and the Pussycat (see "Background" re stage version of film)
- Nobody Loves an Albatross
- Never Too Late
- Take Her, She's Mine

== Death ==
Klotz died at her Manhattan home of cardiac arrest, four days after her 86th birthday. Her only immediate survivor was her niece, Suzanne DeMarco. Klotz's partner, producer and stage manager Ruth Mitchell, died in 2000.

== Awards ==
All of the Tony Awards Klotz won were for musicals directed by Hal Prince, with whom she had a long association. Her sixth award, for the 1994 revival of Show Boat, gave her more Tonys than any previous costume designer.

- 1995: Show Boat
- 1993: Kiss of the Spider Woman: The Musical
- 1985: Grind
- 1976: Pacific Overtures
- 1973: A Little Night Music
- 1972: Follies

She won the Drama Desk Award for Outstanding Costume Design five times, three L.A. Critic Circle Awards, and two Outer Critics Circle Awards. In 2002, she received the Patricia Zipprodt Award from the Fashion Institute of Technology; and in 2005, she won the Irene Sharaff Lifetime Achievement Award.
