= Freddy Wittop =

Costume designer

- Born: Frederick Wittop Koning; July 26, 1911; Bussum, Netherlands
- Died: February 2, 2001 (aged 89); Atlantis, Florida
- Occupations: Costume designer, educator, dancer
- Years active: 1931-1973
- Known for: Tony Awards for Best Costumes (1964)- Hello Dolly! Drama Desk Awards - Outstanding Costume Design (1970) - A Patriot For Me
- Notable work: Costumes for Hello Dolly! (1964), A Patriot For Me (1970), production costumes for Lucille Ball, George Abbott, and Josephine Baker

Freddy Wittop (July 26, 1911 – February 2, 2001) was a costume designer. He enjoyed secondary careers as a dancer and college professor.

Born Frederick Wittop Koning in Bussum, Netherlands, Wittop emigrated with his family to Brussels, where he apprenticed at the age of thirteen with the resident designer at the Brussels Opera. Moving to Paris in 1931, he designed for the Folies Bergère and other music halls, creating costumes for Mistinguett and Josephine Baker, among others. He studied Spanish dance and, as Frederico Rey, began a professional career that led to international acclaim as he and his first partner, La Argentinita, performed worldwide. He also toured with Jose Greco and Tina Ramirez.

In 1942, Wittop designed costumes for the Ice Capades, George Abbott's Broadway musical Beat the Band, and Lucille Ball for her film melodrama The Big Street. Soon after this, Wittop joined the U.S. Armed Forces during World War II and served overseas for three and a half years. His service awarded him American citizenship.

Once Wittop returned to America after the war, he had a stint dressing show girls and dancers at the Latin Quarter (nightclub) in New York City. He then formed his own dance company in 1951 and for the next seven years toured the US and Europe. He returned to theatre design at the behest of director Harold Clurman, who saw his show and asked him to design his 1959 Broadway production of George Bernard Shaw's Heartbreak House. He actively worked in New York for the next fourteen years.

In 1973, Wittop retired to Ibiza, where he remained for eleven years before returning to New York to work on two more projects before settling in Tequesta, Florida. He frequently traveled to Athens, Georgia, where he held a position as adjunct professor in the school of drama at the University of Georgia.

Wittop died at age 89 at the JFK Medical Center in Atlantis, Florida, on February 2, 2001, shortly after being chosen as the 2001 recipient of the Theatre Development Fund's Irene Sharaff Award for "lifetime achievement in theatrical costume design."

His original sketches have been showcased in museums and sold in art galleries throughout the country. A considerable amount of his personal collection is retained at the University of Georgia in the Hargrett Rare Book and Manuscript Library.

== Productions ==
- Carnival! (1961)
- Subways Are For Sleeping (1961)
- Hello, Dolly! (1964)
- Bajour (1964)
- Kelly (1965)
- The Roar of the Greasepaint - The Smell of the Crowd (1965)
- On a Clear Day You Can See Forever (1965)
- I Do! I Do! (1966)
- Breakfast at Tiffany's (1966)
- The Happy Time (1968)
- George M! (1968)
- Dear World (1969)
- A Patriot for Me (1969)
- Lovely Ladies, Kind Gentlemen (1970)
- The Three Musketeers (1984)
- Wind in the Willows (1985)

== Awards and nominations ==
Year	Award	Category	Work	Result
1964	Tony Award	Best Costume Design	Hello Dolly!	Won
1965	Tony Award	Best Costume Design	The Roar of the Greasepaint – The Smell of the Crowd	Nominated
1967	Tony Award	Best Costume Design	I Do ! I Do!	Nominated
1968	Tony Award	Best Costume Design	The Happy Time	Nominated
1970	Tony Award	Best Costume Design	A Patriot for Me	Nominated
1970	Drama Desk Award	Outstanding Costume Design	A Patriot for Me	Won
1971	Tony Award	Best Costume Design	Lovely Ladies, Kind Gentlemen	Nominated
