= Happy Birthday (play) =

1946 stage play by Anita Loos

- Original language: English
- Written by: Anita Loos
- Genre: Comedy
- Setting: Newark, New Jersey; 1940s

Premiere
- Date: October 31, 1946
- Place: Broadhurst Theatre

Happy Birthday is a comedic stage play written by American playwright Anita Loos. The play premiered on Broadway at the Broadhurst Theatre in 1946. The show was nominated for two Tony Awards, Best Costumes by Lucinda Ballard and Best Lead Actress in a Play for Helen Hayes, who won the award as Addie Bemis. The plays tells the story of a librarian and her escapades when she decides to have a night on the town.

== Production history ==
The play opened on October 31, 1946 at the Broadhurst Theatre to financial success, extending its run and transferring to the Plymouth Theatre. The show closed its run on March 13, 1948 after 563 performances. The show was produced by Richard Rodgers and Oscar Hammerstein, who also wrote a song for the play titled "I Haven't Got a Worry in the World". The show was directed by Joshua Logan. Cloris Leachman served as Hayes' understudy.

== Reception ==
The independent newspaper PM wrote, "It is not the accomplished Miss Loos' best, or even second-best, manner. It is not in any way Miss Loos' evening. But thanks to Miss Hayes, and Jo Mielziner, and Joshua Logan, the Cinderella story Miss Loos has enacted in a Newark honky-tonk manages to chin itself up from a piece of trash to a piece of popular theater….Her [Miss Hayes'] performance needed all the trick lighting and clever scenic detail, all the stage atmosphere and honky-tonk commotion are needed, for the yarn itself dwindles into piffle when it isn't being blown up into absurdity. One trouble with settling for 'Happy Birthday' as a pure-and-simple Cinderella fantasy is that Miss Loos is a little too shrewd about life quite to swallow her own formula whole. Miss Loos, who is not by nature a sentimentalist, has made her pie-eyed heroine just female enough, just feline enough, to suggest how really badly a repressed virgin smitten with a bank clerk might misbehave once the lid is off. Had Miss Loos cared to be realistic, along with being funny and touching, she might have shown Addie Bemis having herself a god-awful whale of a time—and ending up with a hangover for life. But Miss Loos did not care—or is it a dare?—to be realistic, and ‘Happy Birthday' accumulates trash for two acts before being covered with it at the end, when Addie is allowed to get her man. This is what Hollywood, I imagine, calls a Broadway ending."

PM also summarized other New York critics' reactions: [Brooks Atkinson, NY Times] "A delightful, sentimental comedy"; [Robert Coleman, NY Mirror] "If you're willing to settle for a pleasant evening's diversion with one of the theater's most charming stars, don't miss it"; [John Chapman, NY News] "Miss Loos' play is a lot of junk and not too brightly written… but the important part of 'Happy Birthday' is Miss Hayes….a wonderful commedienne"; [Ward Morehouse, NY Sun] "No epochal play, but it has charm…is produced with vast ingenuity"; [Robert Garland, NY Journal-American] "It misses on almost every count. Everything about it is overdone"; [Richard Watts, Jr., NY Post] "An attenuated little comedy without much in the way of writing or imagination to give it eventfulness or continuous interest"; [Arthur Pollock, Brooklyn Eagle] "You get a lot for your money, and it glitters, but not because of any kind of polish"; [Bill Leonard, WABC radio] "Single-handedly [Miss Hayes] takes a clap-trappy pseudo-fantasy and turns it into a fair to middling silk purse."

== Original cast and characters ==
Character	Broadway (1946)
Addie Bemis	Helen Hayes
Paul	Louis Jean Heydt
Mr. Bemis	Robert Burton
Maud	Lorraine Miller
Tot	Enid Markey
The Judge	Ralph Theadore
Gail	Margaret Irving
Dad Malone	Thomas Heaphy
Emma	Grace Valentine
Bella	Florence Sundstrom
Gabe	Charles Gordon
Don	Dort Clark

== Awards and nominations ==
=== Original Broadway production ===
Year	Award	Category	Nominee	Result
1947	Tony Award	Best Actress in a Play	Helen Hayes	Won
1947	Tony Award	Best Costume Design	Lucinda Ballard	Won
