= Michael Annals =

Michael Annals (21 April 1938 – 1990) was a theatrical scenic and costume designer.

== Biography ==
Michael Annals was born in what was then Harrow, Middlesex (later incorporated into Greater London) on 21 April 1938. His parents were Henry Ernest Annals and Constance Anne Annals (née Walter). He attended the Harrow Weald County Grammar School and the Hornsey College of Art.

== Theatrical career ==
Michael Annals began his career in 1961 by designing the sets and costumes for the Old Vic company's Soviet Union tour of Macbeth and their production of Dr Faustus at the Edinburgh Festival. In 1964, Annals designed the sets and costumes for another production of Macbeth, this time at the National Theatre of Portugal. Annals produced designs for several original Broadway theatre productions, including The Royal Hunt of the Sun in 1965, the short-lived Those That Play the Clowns in 1966, Staircase in 1968, and Noises Off in 1983.

From 1966 through 1967, Annals served as Associate Professor of Scenic Design at Yale University. Annals was nominated for the 1969 Tony Award for Best Costume Design for his work in Morning, Noon and Night, though the award was won by Loudon Sainthill for his work on Canterbury Tales.

== Film career ==
Michael Annals has produced designs for two major films: The 1962 film adaptation of Eugene O'Neill's play Long Day's Journey into Night and the 1977 film adaptation of Henry Fielding's play Joseph Andrews. Annals served as both the production designer and costume designer for both films. Annals was nominated for the 1977 BAFTA Award for Best Costume Design for his work in Joseph Andrews, though the award was won by Danilo Donati for his work in Fellini's Casanova.
