= Brian Sullivan (tenor) =

American opera singer (1917–1969)

- Born: Harry Joseph Sullivan; August 9, 1917; Oakland, California
- Died: June 17, 1969 (aged 51); Lake Geneva, Switzerland
- Education: University of Southern California
- Occupation: Tenor singer
- Spouse: Marie Pauline Horn (1938–1969, his death)
- Children: 3

Brian Sullivan (August 9, 1917 – June 17, 1969) was an American tenor who sang in films, on radio, on television, and with the Metropolitan Opera, San Francisco Opera, and the Lyric Opera of Chicago, as well as with other groups.

== Early years ==
Sullivan was born Harry Joseph Sullivan in Oakland, California. After living in Salt Lake City, the family moved to Los Angeles, where he attended Manual Arts High School. His initial study of singing occurred late in his high school years. He went on to study voice at the University of Southern California.

== Career ==
Unable to find openings in operas early in his career, Sullivan delved into musical comedy productions and toured with the Ice Follies for one winter. In 1943, he gained performing experience with the American Music Theatre in Pasadena, California. His performances there led to a contract with Metro-Goldwyn-Mayer film studios, but that was interrupted when he went into the U.S. Army. He began his military service in the motor pool but soon was transferred to Special Services.

In 1946, Sullivan sang the role of Gaylord Ravenal in a revival of Show Boat in New York. A year later, he performed on Broadway in Kurt Weill's Street Scene. His audition for the Metropolitan Opera occurred during the run of Street Scene, and at the close of that production he was signed by the Central City Opera in Colorado to sing in its presentation of Beethoven's Fidelio.

Sullivan debuted at the Metropolitan Opera in 1948, in the title role in Britten's Peter Grimes. He also became "the first American singer in a generation to sing the title role in Wagner's Lohengrin."

Sullivan was heard frequently on The Bell Telephone Hour on radio and appeared often on The Voice of Firestone on television.

== Films ==
Sullivan's screen debut came in an uncredited part in This Man's Navy (1945). He also had bit parts in Thrill of a Romance (1945) and Courage of Lassie (1946).

== Recordings ==
In 1947, Columbia Records released a six-record album of music from Street Scene, with Sullivan and other cast members performing songs from the Broadway production.

- Walhall CD, The Magic Flute, Bruno Walter, Metropolitan Opera 1956

== Personal life ==
Sullivan married Marie Pauline Horn on April 2, 1938. They had three children.

== Death ==
On June 17, 1969, Sullivan's body was found floating in Lake Geneva. He had been in Geneva, Switzerland, to sing Siegfried in a production of Götterdämmerung at the Grand Théâtre de Genève. He had been missing for several days.
