= Questions (game) =

Language game

Questions is a game in which players maintain a dialogue of asking questions back and forth for as long as possible without making any declarative statements. Play begins when the first player serves by asking a question (often "Would you like to play questions?"). The second player must respond to the question with another question (e.g. "How do you play that?"). Each player must quickly continue the conversation by using only questions. Hesitations, statements, and non sequiturs are not allowed, and result in a foul. The game is usually played by two players, although multiplayer variants exist. The game may also be played with a referee. A subject must be decided upon at the start.

== Rules ==
Scoring is done by foul. Fouls can be called for:

- statement: player fails to reply with a question
- hesitation: player takes too long to reply or grunts or makes a false start
- repetition: player asks questions identical to or synonymous with one already asked this game (not match)
- rhetoric: player asks a rhetorical question
- non sequitur: player responds with an unrelated question
- synonym: player asks a question almost the same as a previous question
- grunts: player makes a noise with question-like inflection that the other player cannot answer with a question

When a foul is called on a player, their opponent is awarded one point. First player to get three points wins a game. Matches are played to best out of three games.

In one multiplayer variant, the game is played with two lines facing each other. The two opponents at the heads of the lines play each other and go to the back of the line (or the other line) when they foul. Scoring can be however the players like.

== In popular culture ==
=== Rosencrantz and Guildenstern Are Dead ===
The game of Questions is featured prominently in Tom Stoppard's play Rosencrantz and Guildenstern Are Dead, and in an abridged form in the 1990 film adaptation of the same. The following is an excerpt from the play:

R: Could we play at questions?
G: What good would that do?
R: Practice!
G: Statement! One–love.
R: Cheating!
G: How?
R: I hadn't started yet.
G: Statement. Two–love.
R: Are you counting that?
G: What?
R: Are you counting that?
G: Foul! No repetitions. Three–love. First game to...

The neo-Vaudevillian troupe The Flying Karamazov Brothers incorporated Stoppard's version of the Questions game into at least two Karamazov shows ("Juggling and Cheap Theatrics" and "Club!"). Karamazov brothers "Ivan" and "Dmitri" (Howard Jay Patterson and Paul David Magid) would play the game while performing takeaway juggling with three beanbags. The jugglers gleefully inform the audience that the routine is "copyrighted and used by permission!"

=== Whose Line is it Anyway? ===
A variation is played on the show Whose Line is it Anyway?, where a specific setting is established and players are replaced when they foul. The rules for determining a foul are not so strict in this version of the game, since the point is to entertain the audience rather than determine who is the best player. It is left to the judgment of the host, who "buzzes out" a player who fouls, with the purpose of keeping the game fast-paced and funny. (The host typically buzzes out a player for statement, hesitation, or "cracking up" with laughter, rarely buzzing out for a non-sequitur.) As with the show's other games, it is played for an unspecified length of time; at the end of the game, the host arbitrarily chooses a "winner", who receives an arbitrary number of meaningless "points".
