= The Royal Hunt of the Sun =

1964 theatre piece by Peter Shaffer

Poster of original production

The Royal Hunt of the Sun is a 1964 play by Peter Shaffer that dramatizes the relation of two worlds entering into conflict by portraying two characters: Atahuallpa and Francisco Pizarro.

== Performance history ==
=== Premiere ===
The Royal Hunt of the Sun was first presented at the Chichester Festival by the National Theatre and subsequently at the Old Vic in July 1964. It was directed by John Dexter and designed by Michael Annals with music composed by Marc Wilkinson and movement by Claude Chagrin.

The cast was led by Robert Stephens as Atahuallpa and Colin Blakely as Francisco Pizarro and included Oliver Cotton, Graham Crowden, Paul Curran, Michael Gambon, Edward Hardwicke, Anthony Hopkins, Derek Jacobi, Robert Lang, John McEnery, Edward Petherbridge, Louise Purnell and Christopher Timothy.

The production was a critical and commercial success. In addition to its run at the Old Vic, it played at the Queen's Theatre, London, and toured to Aberdeen, Glasgow, Stratford, Leeds, Oxford and Nottingham.

=== Broadway ===
The first Broadway performance took place at the ANTA Playhouse on 26 October 1965. The production by the Theatre Guild was the same as the original London production. In the cast were Christopher Plummer as Pizarro, David Carradine as Atahualpa, John Vernon as de Soto, Robert Aberdeen as the First Inca Indian Chieftain, and George Rose as Old Martin. The lighting design by Martin Aronstein marked the first time exposed lighting was used as an integral part of the design of a Broadway production. The play ran for 261 performances. (Note: The play was the subject of an Al Hirschfeld cartoon published originally in The New York Times.)

=== Australia ===
The play was staged as part of the fourth Adelaide Festival of Arts in 1966. It was directed by John Tasker, designed by Wendy Dickson, with choreography by Margaret Barr.

=== Film version ===
The play was filmed on location by the now defunct National General Pictures studio in 1969, with Robert Shaw as Pizarro, Christopher Plummer switching roles to play Atahualpa, Nigel Davenport as Hernando De Soto, and Leonard Whiting, in his first role after Romeo and Juliet, as Young Martin (Old Martin was omitted from the film). The screen version has been released on DVD.

=== 2006 revival ===
The play was revived by the National at the Olivier Theatre in April 2006 in a production directed by Trevor Nunn, designed by Anthony Ward with the original music by Marc Wilkinson and choreography by Anthony Van Laast. Leading the cast were Alun Armstrong as Pizarro and Paterson Joseph as Atahualpa.

=== 2020 Tokyo ===
The play was performed at the Parco Theatre in March 2020 in a production directed by Will Tuckett, with original score by Paul Englishby, designed by Colin Richmond, with projection design by Douglas O'Connell, and Lighting by Satoshi Sato. Leading the cast were Ken Watanabe as Pizarro and Hio Miyazawa as Atahualpa. The production was recorded and broadcast on WOWOW television Japan, June 27 2020

== Opera ==
An opera based on the play, with music and libretto by British composer Iain Hamilton, was premièred by ENO at the London Coliseum in 1977.

== Synopsis ==
The play begins in Spain, where Pizarro recruits 167 men for an expedition to Peru. He is accompanied by his second-in-command Hernando de Soto, and Vincente de Valverde, a Catholic priest determined to spread the shining light of Christianity. It is narrated or commented upon by Old Martin, a jaded man in his mid-fifties. Young Martin – another character in the play – is his younger counterpart, integrated with the time-frame in which the expedition commences. At the beginning of the voyage he is obsessed with chivalry, glory and honour, but becomes increasingly disillusioned throughout, as Pizarro's crisis of faith also unravels.

The Spanish invade Peru, hungry for gold. After many weeks, they climb a mountain to reach the abode of Atahualpa, the king of Incas and also the son of the Sun god. The Spaniards massacre 3,000 Incas and take Atahualpa captive. Instead of killing him, Pizarro makes a deal with Atahualpa whereby, if he fills an entire room with objects made from gold in two months, Atahualpa will be set free and will not harm Pizarro. As the room fills up, Pizarro and Atahualpa become increasingly close. Pizarro, who suffers constant pain from an old wound, has a crisis of faith. He reveals to Martin that he used to dream of the Sun God as a child. When the room is finally filled, Pizarro asks Atahualpa to swear to leave his men unharmed, but the king refuses. The Spaniards urge Pizarro to have Atahualpa executed, and the beginnings of a mutiny against Pizarro stir. Atahualpa tells Pizarro to allow his men to kill him, because, as the son of the Sun, he will revive the morning after anybody kills him. Pizarro agrees to do this, and is inducted into the Incan religion by Atahualpa personally. Atahualpa is decreed to burn at the stake, and Pizarro has this changed to strangling (since Atahualpa's body is required intact for the rebirth to work) if Atahualpa agrees to be baptised. He does so, and is strangled. Pizarro waits until dawn with the body, but it does not re-awake, leading him to hold the body and weep while Old Martin narrates the end of the story.

== Production notes ==
The expedition is predominantly in the name of gold, religion and belief; all Incas being heathens who must be brought before God. The play critically studies these two themes throughout the discovery of Atahualpa – the Inca Sun God – and massacre of the Incas themselves.

Music is a key element to this play, more so than any other by Peter Shaffer. He wanted strange and disturbing sounds produced on primitive instruments such as saws, reed pipes, drums (tablas and bongos) and cymbals to create the aural world of 16th Century Peru. Shaffer was so impressed with Marc Wilkinson's score for The Royal Hunt of the Sun, which he has described as "perhaps the best score for a play to be written since Grieg embellished Peer Gynt", that he now considers it integral to the play.

The staging is relatively simple: an upper and lower part to the stage making up the ground plan. The main attribute is the image of the sun, which presents a creative challenge for all who undertake this mammoth production. There have been numerous suns over the years, but when the play was first staged it was a large metal contraption, with huge 'petals' that opened up and outwards. Visuals are of the essence with this play, especially the lavish Inca costumes.

Although the play is performed on an open platform stage with little scenery, the film version opened it up considerably.
