= A Patriot for Me =

Play written by John Osborne

A Patriot for Me is a 1965 play by the English playwright John Osborne, based on the true story of Alfred Redl. The controversial refusal of a performance licence by the Lord Chamberlain's Office played a role in the passage of the Theatres Act 1968.

== Plot ==
The play depicts Redl, a homosexual in the Austro-Hungarian intelligence service in the 1890s, as he is blackmailed by the Russians into a series of treasonous betrayals. The play highlights the dangers that a non-conformist faces in a declining empire. Its dramatic climax, and the scene that most excited the censor, is the Drag Ball, in which members of the upper echelons of Viennese society appear in drag. Mary McCarthy, the American novelist, wrote in The Observer that the play's "chief merit is to provide work for a number of homosexual actors, or normal actors who can pass as homosexual". A Patriot for Me remains rarely performed because of the large cast required.

== Production issues ==
When the Royal Court Theatre produced A Patriot For Me in 1965, it was forced to change from a public theatre to a private members' club. The play was deemed too sexually transgressive by the Lord Chamberlain's Office, and denied a licence for performance. The Royal Court suffered a considerable financial loss because of this denial.

George Devine, founder of the English Stage Company, was performing in this play when he died of a heart attack.

== Legacy ==
A musical adaptation of A Patriot for Me, with music by Laurence Rosenthal, was produced on Broadway in 1969. The Chichester Festival Theatre revived Osborne's original play successfully in 1983 with Alan Bates in the lead role and Sheila Gish and June Ritchie sharing the part of the Countess; a 1995 revival by the RSC starred James Wilby as Redl.

The 1985 film Colonel Redl states in its credits that Osborne's play "inspired" it, and the film-makers paid him a £20,000 "courtesy fee". There are significant differences in emphasis.

== Awards and honors ==
=== Original Broadway production ===
Year	Award	Category	Nominee	Result
1970	Tony Award	Best Performance by a Featured Actor in a Play	Dennis King	Nominated
1970	Tony Award	Best Costume Design	Freddy Wittop	Nominated
1970	Drama Desk Award	Outstanding Costume Design	Freddy Wittop	Won
