= Jane Greenwood =

British costume designer (born 1934)

- Born: 30 April 1934 (age 91); Liverpool
- Known for: Costume designer

Jane Greenwood (born 30 April 1934) is a British costume designer for the stage, television, film, opera, and dance. Born in Liverpool, England, she works both in England and the United States. She has been nominated for the Tony Award for costume design twenty-one times and won the award for her work on The Little Foxes.

== Biography ==
Greenwood attended Liverpool Art School and the Central School of Arts and Crafts, and then started working at the Oxford Playhouse, in charge of the costume department. She started working in the Ray Diffen costume shop in New York City in 1962. In New York, she met and married scenic designer and producer Ben Edwards.

Greenwood's work includes designing for over 100 productions, The Ballad of the Sad Cafe (1963), her first Broadway play, to Hamlet with Richard Burton (1964), 70, Girls, 70 (1971), Romantic Comedy (1979), I Hate Hamlet (1991), The Sisters Rosensweig (1993), and Stephen Sondheim's Passion (1994).

In addition to her many Broadway credits, she has designed costumes for many productions for the Manhattan Theatre Club, including Accent on Youth (2009), Lincoln Center Theater, Belle Epoque, 2005, and The Roundabout Theatre Company, Waiting for Godot (2009), A Month in the Country (1994–95), Outer Critics Circle Award nomination, and She Loves Me (1992–93).

In England, she was nominated for the Olivier Award for her costume designs for She Loves Me (1995).

Her television work includes several Public Television plays for "The American Playhouse", made-for-television movies, such as In the Gloaming, HBO (1997) and the miniseries Kennedy (1983).

For opera, she has designed for the Metropolitan Opera House, such as Ariadne in 1987. For dance, she designed the original costumes for the Alvin Ailey dance Night Creature (1974).

She teaches at the Yale Drama School. Greenwood received the Theater Development Fund Irene Sharaff Award for Lifetime Achievement in 1998.

Greenwood has been awarded the 2014 Tony Award for Lifetime Achievement in the Theatre. The executive directors of the Broadway League and American Theater Wing said, in part "She has made a significant imprint on the history of Broadway with her artistry. Her work has not only elevated the craft of costume design but has inspired generations of designers to come."

In 2015, Greenwood designed the costumes for the Broadway debut of Helen Edmundson's play, Thérèse Raquin.

== Awards ==
- Lucille Lortel Award, (costume design) Old Money (2001)
- Henry Hewes Design Award, (costume design) Tartuffe (1965), The Heiress (1995), Sylvia (1995),Tartuffe (2003)
- Lucille Lortel Award, (costume design) Sylvia (1996)
- American Theater Hall of Fame (2003)
- Tony Award, Lifetime Achievement in the Theatre (2014)
- Tony Award, Best Costume Design of a Play Lillian Hellman's The Little Foxes (2017)
- Henry Hewes Design Award, Ming Cho Lee Lifetime Achievement Award, (2019)
