= Bluewater Health =

Geography
- Location: 89 Norman St; Sarnia, Lambton County, Ontario, Canada
- Coordinates: 42.976802°N 82.390299°W

Organization
- Care system: Medicare
- Type: General
- Network: Erie St. Clair Local Health Integration Network

Services
- Emergency department: Yes
- Beds: 326

Helipads
- Helipad: Yes

History
- Founded: 1896

Links
- Website: www.bluewaterhealth.ca

Bluewater Health is a hospital in Sarnia, Ontario, which was created from the merger of two predecessors, Sarnia General Hospital and St. Joseph's Health Centre (formerly St. Joseph's Hospital). It employs almost 1,800 staff and physicians, along with over 700 volunteers, and is Sarnia—Lambton's largest public sector employer. It is funded primarily by the Ministry of Health and Long-Term Care, with additional fundraising by Bluewater Health Foundation and Charlotte Eleanor Englehart Hospital foundation. It has 326 beds, 8 operating rooms, an emergency department, and a full spectrum of programs to serve the approximately 125,000 people in the Sarnia-Lambton area.

== History ==
=== Sarnia General Hospital ===
There were several doctors in the Sarnia community in 1880, but because there was no hospital in the area, serious medical help had to be sought in London, 100 kilometres (62 mi) to the east.

On July 7, 1890, a public meeting was held to canvas for subscriptions for a hospital. By 1895, $13,000 had been raised. The community's first public hospital, Sarnia General Hospital, opened on October 3, 1896, at a cost of about $25,000 and originally consisted of a three-story building with 26 beds. It was located at Mitton, George, Essex and MacKenzie streets (known as the Mitton Street site) and operated there for over a century.

The hospital was operated by a trust until 1920 when it was given to the city and became a municipally-operated hospital. Stress on the hospital became severe with an admission of about 800 patients a year. In 1929, about 80 beds were added, which met the needs of the community until 1952. In January 1953, the hospital doors were closed while construction of a new five-story building took place. The new hospital opened in March 1954 at a cost of about $2.7 million, and had enough beds for 266 adults and 50 newborns. By November 1963, expansion of the facility led to a capacity of 315 beds at a cost of about $1.5 million.

=== St. Joseph's ===
St. Joseph's Hospital was founded on Norman Street at the southeast corner of London Street and Russell Street, with construction starting in 1944 and being fully opened in 1946. In 1942 The Sisters of St. Joseph of the Diocese of London were invited by the Sarnia City Council to open a hospital. Construction began in 1944 after numerous delays and shortages due to WWII. It was opened fully operational with 150 beds on March 1, 1946.⁣⁣ The entire million-dollar project was funded by the Sisters of St. Joseph, with a $10,000 grant from the city. Many of the staff were mothers of families who could only work occasionally. Students from St. Joseph's Training School of Nursing in London helped fill the nursing rota, and were hired permanently after graduation. By September 1948, a detoxification centre was opened and many alcoholics were treated at the hospital. ⁣⁣

In 1959, there was a seven-storey, two million dollar addition and an increase of 150 active treatment beds. In 1960, a 45-bed pediatric wing was added. ⁣⁣In 1963 The first St. Joseph's Auxiliary Ball was held. Besides being a major fundraiser, this was a significant social event in the community for years to come.⁣⁣ In the 1970s, the hospital needed to update its facilities to meet accreditation standards, as well as to comply with the Sisters’ own standards of care. The end of this tumultuous period saw all Obstetrics care moved to St. Joseph's while all Pediatrics was transferred to Sarnia General Hospital.⁣

In the 1980s, quality assurance became a major focus, and new services such as the chiropody and palliative care were added. The new Chronic Care Facility was financed and completed. ⁣⁣St. Joseph's Hospital was officially re-opened as St. Joseph's Health Centre on October 12, 1990. St. Joseph's Health Centre no longer served exclusively as an in-patient treatment centre for the critically ill. It also provided long-term care beds and outpatient treatment. ⁣⁣In January 1995, the Sisters donated their residence at 430 London Road to St. Joseph Health Centre to be used as a hospice. ⁣⁣The Sisters’ legacy spanned 60 years, as the last Sister, Mary Vandersteen, retired from the hospital in 2005.

=== Amalgamation ===
Sarnia General and St. Joseph's hospitals amalgamated in 2003 to form Bluewater Health, although the newly combined authority still operated out of both Mitton Street and Norman Street properties until 2011. Bluewater Health vacated the Mitton location in 2011, consolidating operations at the more modernized Norman Street site. The derelict buildings on the Mitton Street site stood empty for several years and were seen as a blight upon the community, until the Ontario Superior Court ruled that the municipality and not the province was the legal owner, then demolition occurred from 2017 to 2018 to prepare the land for housing redevelopment.

In 2010, there were extensive renovations to the two existing buildings and construction of a third on the former St. Joseph's Hospital site. With construction and redevelopment completed at a cost of $319 million, the hospital now encompasses about 600,000 square feet (56,000 m^{2}).

== Programs and services ==
- Ambulatory care (Note: Not an exhaustive list; see ref for full list of services)
- Bone density
- Cancer care
- Cardiology
- Communication disorders
- CT scan
- Diagnostic imaging
- Dialysis
- Emergency services
- Intensive care
- Mammography
- Mental health & addiction
- MRI
- Occupational therapy
- Palliative care
- Physiotherapy
- Surgery
- X-ray

== Statistics ==
Babies born: 969 (Note: Statistics for the 2013-2014 year)
Number of beds: 326
Dialysis treatments: 8,453
Emergency room visits: 83,690
Hospitalizations: 12,025
Laboratory procedures: 2,719,894
MRIs: 7,943
Surgeries: 10,680

== Community engagement ==
Bluewater Health has two advisory panels composed of residents of the surrounding community, including students from local secondary and post-secondary schools. The panels meet four times yearly to gather and share input into hospital planning and decision-making. The CEO attends the meetings along with a representative of the board of directors.

The hospital welcomes presentations from diverse cultural perspectives. It has met with representatives from the local Muslim association regarding Islamic customs, dietary concerns, etc.; and with a local Aboriginal patient representative with regards to cultural implications for healthcare.

== Awards and recognition ==
Accreditation Canada awarded Bluewater Health the distinction of "Accreditation with Exemplary Standing" for 2015–2019, with a score of 99.3%. In 2012, it became the first acute care hospital in Ontario to achieve LEED certification (Leadership in Energy and Environmental Design). In 2016, Bluewater Health achieved a 97% patient satisfaction rate.

Other awards:

- Bridging Excellence Award (2015)
- Ontario's Best Practice Spotlight Organization (2015)
- Bill Wilson Patient Safety Award (2014)
- Quality Healthcare Workplace Award (2011, 2012, 2013, 2014)
- Ontario Accessibility Award (2012)
- Outstanding Business Achievement (2011)
