= Desmond Heeley =

British set and costume designer

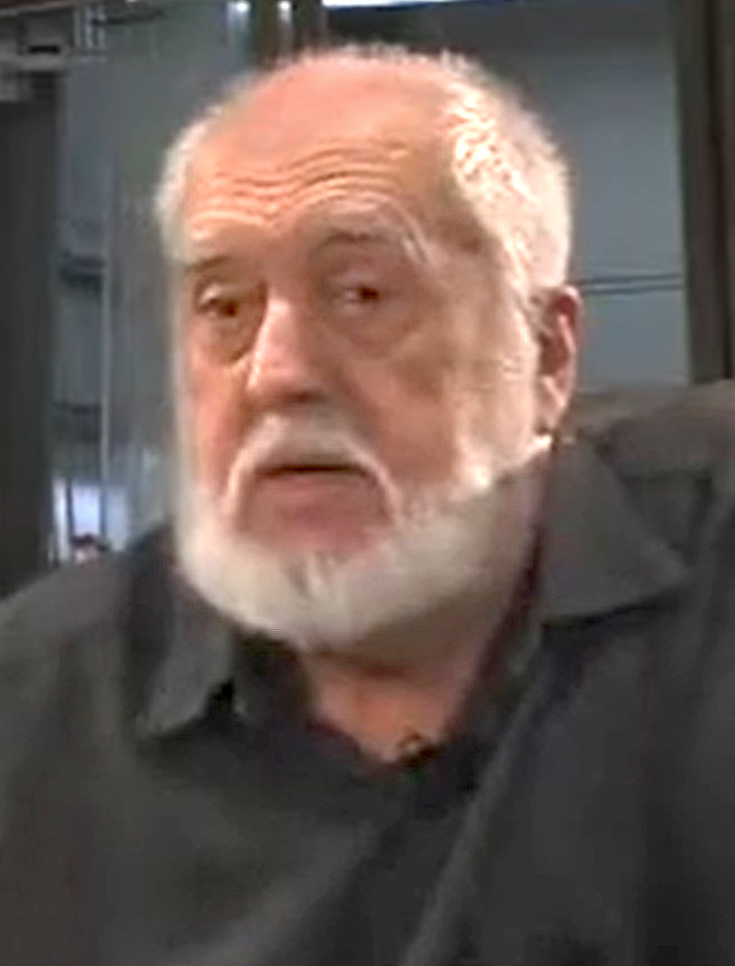
- Heeley in 2006
- Born: 1 June 1931; Staffordshire, England, United Kingdom
- Died: 10 June 2016 (aged 85); New York, United States
- Occupation(s): Set and costume designer
- Awards: Tony Award x 3

Desmond Heeley (1 June 1931 – 10 June 2016) was a British set and costume designer who had an active international career in theater, ballet and opera from the late 1940s through the 2010s.

== Career ==
Heeley was born in Staffordshire, England and began his career as an apprentice designer at the Royal Shakespeare Theatre in 1948, and soon established himself as an important designer at that theater and at Sadler's Wells Theatre in London. In 1957, he designed his first set for the Stratford Festival in Ontario, Canada, with whom he established a very long professional relationship, designing sets for more than 40 productions through 2009. He also designed sets and costumes for several Broadway productions and at the Metropolitan Opera. He also taught design at the Tisch School for the Arts at NYU, as well as other universities in the United States, England and Canada.

== Awards ==
Heeley has won three Tony Awards. He was notably the first designer to win Tony Awards for both sets and costumes for the same production with his work on the Royal National Theatre production of Rosencrantz and Guildenstern Are Dead in 1968. His third Tony Award win was for the costumes for The Importance of Being Earnest in 2011.

In 1994, he received the TDF/Irene Sharaff Lifetime Achievement Award (now known as the TDF/Irene Sharaff Award for Sustained Excellence in Costume Design) and was the first person after the award's namesake to receive it.

In 2013, he received The Robert L. B. Tobin Award for Sustained Excellence in Theatrical Design, as well as the USITT Distinguished Achievement Award for his work in costume and scenic design. His USITT award was the first time the Institute gave both awards to one designer.
