= Ann Curtis (costume designer) =

British costume designer

Ann Curtis is a British costume designer who has designed costumes in films and Broadway theater dramas like Anthony and Cleopatra (1972), Me and My Girl (1987) and Jekyll & Hyde (1997).

== Career ==
In an interview after the film version of Anthony & Cleopatra, Curtis commented that the world of ancient Egypt (in particular the ancient Egyptian script) provided inspiration for her designs. However, she did not want to be slavishly accurate.

== Filmography ==
- The Rothschilds (1970–1972)
- A Midsummer Night's Dream (1968)
- The Wars (1983)
- Jekyll & Hyde (2001)
- Me and My Girl (1987)
- Antony and Cleopatra (1974)

== Awards ==
Tony Award for Best Costume Design

- 1987 for "Me and My Girl" – nominated
- 1997 for "Jekyll and Hyde (musical)" – nominated
