= Rosencrantz and Guildenstern Are Dead =

1966 play by Tom Stoppard

- Original language: English
- Written by: Tom Stoppard
- Characters: Rosencrantz; Guildenstern; The Player; Alfred; Hamlet; Tragedians; King Claudius; Gertrude; Polonius; Ophelia; Horatio; Fortinbras; Soldiers, courtiers, and musicians
- Genre: Tragicomedy surreal humour black comedy
- Setting: Shakespeare's Hamlet

Premiere
- Date: 24 August 1966
- Place: Edinburgh Fringe

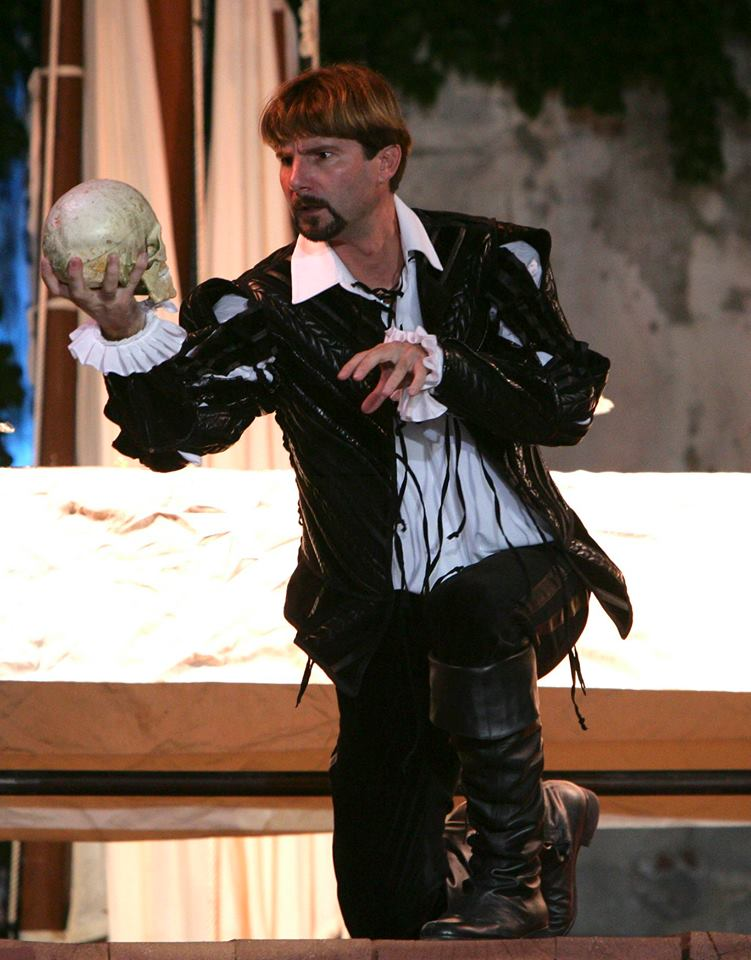
Josip Zovko as Hamlet, HNK Split

Rosencrantz and Guildenstern Are Dead is an absurdist, existential tragicomedy by Tom Stoppard, first staged at the Edinburgh Festival Fringe in 1966. The play expands upon the exploits of two minor characters from Shakespeare's Hamlet, the courtiers Rosencrantz and Guildenstern, and the main setting is Denmark.

The action of Stoppard's play takes place mainly "in the wings" of Shakespeare's Hamlet, with brief appearances of major characters from Hamlet who enact fragments of the original's scenes. Between these episodes, the two protagonists voice their confusion at the progress of events occurring onstage without them in Hamlet, of which they have no direct knowledge.

Comparisons have been drawn with Samuel Beckett's Waiting for Godot, for the presence of two central characters who almost appear to be two halves of a single character. Many plot features are similar as well: the characters pass time by playing Questions, impersonating other characters, and interrupting each other or remaining silent for long periods of time.

== Title ==
The title is a direct quotation from the final scene of Shakespeare's Hamlet. In an earlier scene, Prince Hamlet has been exiled to England by the treacherous King of Denmark (his uncle Claudius, who has murdered Hamlet's father to obtain the throne). En route to England, Hamlet discovers a letter from King Claudius which is being carried to England by Hamlet's old but now untrusted friends Rosencrantz and Guildenstern. The letter commands that Hamlet be put to death upon his arrival in England. Hamlet rewrites the letter to command that instead, Rosencrantz and Guildenstern be put to death. He then escapes back to Denmark.

Ultimately, Prince Hamlet, Laertes, Ophelia, Polonius, King Claudius, and Queen Gertrude all lie dead. An ambassador from England arrives on scene to bluntly report "Rosencrantz and Guildenstern are dead" as well (Hamlet. Act V, Scene II, line 411). By the end of Shakespeare's play, Horatio is the only main figure left alive.

== Characters ==
- Rosencrantz and Guildenstern: childhood friends of Hamlet.
- The Player: a travelling actor.
- Hamlet: the Prince of Denmark, nephew to Claudius.
- Tragedians: travelling with the Player, including Alfred.
- King Claudius: the King of Denmark, Hamlet's uncle and stepfather.
- Gertrude: the Queen of Denmark, and Hamlet's mother.
- Polonius: Claudius's chief adviser.
- Laertes: Polonius's son
- Ophelia: Polonius's daughter.
- Horatio: friend of Hamlet.
- Fortinbras: nephew of the King of Norway.

== Summary ==
With William Shakespeare's play Hamlet as the backdrop, Rosencrantz and Guildenstern Are Dead concerns the musings and mishaps of the titular characters. The play is structured as the inverse of Hamlet, in which Rosencrantz and Guildenstern are two minor characters who were childhood friends of the Prince. Instead, the duo remains the focus and Hamlet himself is a minor role whose actions occur largely offstage, with the exception of a few short scenes in which the dramatic plays converge.

In Hamlet, Rosencrantz and Guildenstern operate under the King's command in an attempt to discover Hamlet's motives and plot against him. Hamlet, however, derisively mocks and outwits them, so that they, rather than he, are sentenced to death in the end. Rosencrantz and Guildenstern Are Dead explores these events from the perspective of the duo; their actions seem largely nonsensical because they are superseded and, therefore, determined by Hamlet's plot.

After witnessing a performance of The Murder of Gonzago – the play within the play in Hamlet – they find themselves on a ship, transporting Prince Hamlet to the King in England, with the troupe that staged the performance also on board as stowaways. They are supposed to give the King a letter with an instruction to execute Hamlet, who discovers this and replaces the letter with another one. During the voyage, the ship is hijacked by pirates, after which it is discovered that Hamlet has disappeared and the letter now instructs the English monarch to execute them instead.

The troupe recreates the duel scene from Hamlet with Rosencrantz and Guildenstern, at the end, accepting quo fata ferunt ("whither the fates carry [us]"). The play concludes with the final scene from Hamlet in which the English Ambassador arrives and announces that "Rosencrantz and Guildenstern are dead".

== Synopsis ==
=== Act One ===
Rosencrantz and Guildenstern are betting on coin flips. Rosencrantz, who bets heads each time, wins 92 flips in a row. The extreme unlikeliness of this event according to the laws of probability leads Guildenstern to suggest that they may be "within un-, sub- or supernatural forces". It is revealed that the duo are journeying to court on the orders of the King. Guildenstern theorizes on the nature of reality, focusing on how an event becomes increasingly real as more people witness it.

A troupe of Tragedians arrives and offers the two men a show. They seem capable only of performances involving bloodbaths. The next two scenes at court are from the plot of Hamlet. The first, involving Hamlet and Ophelia, takes place offstage in Hamlet—the stage directions repeat exactly the words with which Ophelia describes the event to Polonius in Hamlet. The second is taken directly from Hamlet: Rosencrantz and Guildenstern's first appearance in that play. The Danish king and queen, Claudius and Gertrude, ask the two to discover the nature of Hamlet's recent madness. The royal couple demonstrate an inability to distinguish the two courtiers from one another, as do the characters themselves (to their irritation).

Rosencrantz and Guildenstern attempt to practise for their meeting with the Prince by one pretending to be Hamlet and the other asking him questions, but they glean no new information from it. The act closes with another scene from Hamlet in which they finally meet the Prince face to face.

=== Act Two ===
The conversation ends between Rosencrantz, Guildenstern, and Hamlet. Guildenstern tries to be optimistic, while Rosencrantz admits that the pair made no progress and Hamlet entirely outwitted them.

The Player returns to the stage. He is angry that the pair did not stay to watch their play earlier because, without an audience, his Tragedians are nothing. He tells them to stop questioning their existence because life appears too chaotic to comprehend upon examination. The Player, Rosencrantz, and Guildenstern lose themselves in another illogical conversation that demonstrates the limits of language. The Player leaves to prepare for his production of The Murder of Gonzago, set to be put on in front of Hamlet and the King and Queen.

Claudius and Gertrude enter and begin another short scene taken directly from Hamlet: they ask about the duo's encounter with the Prince, and Rosencrantz and Guildenstern inform them about his interest in the Tragedians' production. After Claudius and Gertrude leave, Rosencrantz and Guildenstern contemplate their job. They see Hamlet walk by but fail to seize the opportunity to interrogate him.

The Tragedians return and perform their dress rehearsal of The Murder of Gonzago. Their play moves beyond the scope of what the reader sees in Hamlet; characters resembling Rosencrantz and Guildenstern are seen taking a sea voyage and meeting their deaths at the hands of English courtiers, foreshadowing the duo's true fate. Rosencrantz does not quite make the connection, but Guildenstern is frightened into a verbal attack on the Tragedians' inability to capture the real essence of death. The stage becomes dark.

When the stage is once again visible, Rosencrantz and Guildenstern lie in the same position as had the actors portraying their deaths. The duo are upset that they have become the pawns of the royal couple. Claudius enters again and tells them to find where Hamlet has hidden Polonius's corpse. After many false starts, they eventually find Hamlet, who leaves with Claudius.

Rosencrantz is delighted to find that his mission is complete, but Guildenstern knows it has not ended. Hamlet enters, speaking with a Norwegian soldier. Rosencrantz decides that he is happy to accompany Hamlet to England because it means freedom from the orders of the Danish court. Guildenstern understands that wherever they go, they are still trapped in this world.

=== Act Three ===
Rosencrantz and Guildenstern find themselves on a ship that has already set sail. The pair seem to have no knowledge of how they got there. At first, they try to determine whether they are still alive, before they recognize that they are not dead and are on board a boat. They remember that Claudius has given them a letter to deliver to England. After some brief confusion over who actually has the letter, they find it and eventually open it. They realize that Claudius has asked for Hamlet to be killed. While Rosencrantz seems hesitant to follow their orders now, Guildenstern convinces him that they are not worthy of interfering with fate and the plans of kings. The stage darkens and, presumably, the characters go to sleep. Hamlet switches the letter with one he has written himself, an act which takes place offstage in Hamlet.

The pair discovers that the Tragedians are hidden ("impossibly", according to the stage directions) in several barrels on deck. They are fleeing Denmark because their play offended Claudius. When Rosencrantz complains that there is not enough action, pirates attack. Hamlet, Rosencrantz, Guildenstern, and the Player all hide in separate barrels. The lights dim.

When the lights come on again, Hamlet has vanished (in Hamlet it is reported that he was kidnapped by pirates from the ship). Rosencrantz and Guildenstern panic, then re-read the letter to find that it now calls for them to be put to death instead of the prince. Guildenstern cannot understand why he and Rosencrantz are so important as to necessitate their executions.

The Player tells Guildenstern that all paths end in death. Guildenstern snaps and draws the Player's dagger from his belt, shouting that his portrayals of death do not do justice to the real thing. He stabs the Player and the Player appears to die. Guildenstern fully believes that he has killed the Player. Seconds later, the Tragedians begin to clap and the Player stands up and bows, revealing the knife to be a theatrical one with a retractable blade. The Tragedians then act out the deaths from the final scene of Hamlet.

The lighting shifts so that Rosencrantz and Guildenstern appear alone. Rosencrantz still does not understand why they must die, yet he resigns himself to his fate and he disappears. Guildenstern wonders when he passed the point where he could have stopped the series of events that has brought him to this point. He disappears as well. The final scene features the last few lines from Shakespeare's Hamlet, as the Ambassador from England announces that Rosencrantz and Guildenstern are dead.

== Motifs and ideas ==
=== Absurdity ===
Stoppard emphasizes the randomness of the world. In the beginning of Act One, Rosencrantz and Guildenstern bet on coin flips and Rosencrantz wins with heads ninety-two times in a row. Guildenstern creates a series of syllogisms in order to interpret this phenomenon, but nothing truly coincides with probability theory.

=== Art vs. reality ===
The players help demonstrate the conflict between art and reality. The world in which Rosencrantz and Guildenstern live lacks order, but art allows people to create artificial order. As the Player says, "There's a design at work in all art." Art and the real world are in conflict. In order to reach out to the only reality he can be sure of, Guildenstern exclaims, "No one gets up after death—there is no applause—there is only silence and some second-hand clothes, and that's death." Stoppard also uses his characters to comment on the believability of theatre. While Guildenstern criticises the Player for his portrayal of death, he believes the Player's performance when Guildenstern thinks he has stabbed him with a knife. Rosencrantz and Guildenstern believe exactly what the actors want them to believe.

=== Metatheatre ===
Metatheatre is a central structural element of Rosencrantz and Guildenstern Are Dead. Scenes that are staged as plays, dumb shows, or commentaries on dramatic theory and practice are prominent in both Stoppard's play and Shakespeare's original tragedy Hamlet. In Hamlet, metatheatrical elements include the Player's speech (2.2), Hamlet's advice to the Players (3.2), and the meta-play "The Mousetrap" (3.3). Since Rosencrantz and Guildenstern are characters from Hamlet itself, Stoppard's entire play can be considered a piece of metatheatre. Bernardina da Silveira Pinheiro observes that Stoppard uses metatheatrical devices to produce a "parody" of the key elements of Shakespeare's Hamlet that includes foregrounding two minor characters considered "nonentities" in the original tragedy.

== Notable productions ==
=== United Kingdom and Ireland ===
The play had its first incarnation as a 1964 one-act titled Rosencrantz and Guildenstern Meet King Lear. The expanded version under the current title was first staged at the Edinburgh Festival Fringe on 24 August 1966, by the Oxford Theatre Group. The play debuted in London with a production at The Old Vic directed by Derek Goldby, designed by Desmond Heeley, and scored by Marc Wilkinson. It premiered on 11 April 1967, with John Stride as Rosencrantz, Edward Petherbridge as Guildenstern, Graham Crowden as the Player, and John McEnery as Hamlet. The play returned to the National Theatre on 14 December 1995 and this production with Adrian Scarborough as Rosencrantz and Simon Russell Beale as Guildenstern subsequently toured to Belfast, Cork, Bath, Newcastle, Sheffield and Bradford.

In 2011 the play was revived in a production directed by Sir Trevor Nunn, opening at Chichester Festival Theatre before transferring to the Theatre Royal Haymarket in London's West End (June–August 2011). It starred Samuel Barnett and Jamie Parker. Tim Curry was originally scheduled to appear as The Player, but dropped out during preview performances at Chichester Festival Theatre due to ill health and was replaced by Chris Andrew Mellon. In 2013, an excerpt of the play was performed by Benedict Cumberbatch (Rosencrantz) and Kobna Holdbrook-Smith (Guildenstern) on the occasion of the 50th anniversary of the National Theatre.

From 25 February to 6 May 2017 the play returned to The Old Vic in a production celebrating its 50th anniversary, directed by David Leveaux and starring Daniel Radcliffe as Rosencrantz, Joshua McGuire as Guildenstern and David Haig as The Player.

On 9 September 2026, it was announced that a revival celebrating the play's 60th anniversary directed by Robert Hastie will run during winter 2027 in the Lyttleton Theatre at the National Theatre, London starring George Fouracres as Rosencrantz and Mawaan Rizwan as Guildenstern.

=== Broadway and Off-Broadway ===
The National Theatre production of Rosencrantz and Guildenstern had a year-long Broadway run from 9 October 1967, through 19 October 1968, initially at the Alvin Theatre, then transferring to the Eugene O'Neill Theatre on 8 January 1968.

The production, which was Stoppard's first on Broadway, totalled eight previews and 420 performances. It was directed by Derek Goldby and designed by Desmond Heeley and starred Paul Hecht as the Player, Brian Murray as Rosencrantz and John Wood as Guildenstern. The play was nominated for eight Tony Awards, and won four: Best Play, Scenic Design, Costume Design and Producer; the director and the three leading actors, all nominated for Tonys, did not win.

The play also won Best Play from the New York Drama Critics Circle in 1968, and Outstanding Production from the Outer Critics Circle in 1969. Clive Barnes of The New York Times described the play as "very funny, very brilliant, very chilling."

The play was profiled in the William Goldman book The Season: A Candid Look at Broadway.

The play had a 1987 New York revival by Roundabout Theatre at the Union Square Theatre, directed by Robert Carsen and featuring John Wood as the Player, Stephen Lang as Rosencrantz and John Rubinstein as Guildenstern. It ran for 40 performances from 29 April to 28 June 1987.

Several times since 1995, the American Shakespeare Center has mounted repertories that included both Hamlet and Rosencrantz and Guildenstern, with the same actors performing the same roles in each; in their 2001 and 2009 seasons the two plays were "directed, designed, and rehearsed together to make the most out of the shared scenes and situations".

Halifax's Neptune Theatre company began a production of the play in January 2024 in Halifax, Nova Scotia, and collaborated with Mirvish Productions for a Toronto, Ontario run beginning in March 2024—the latter of which was extended twice before the first production due to high sales. Both runs featured Billy Boyd as Guildenstern, Dominic Monaghan as Rosencrantz, and Michael Blake as the Player, with the Toronto Star describing them as "a trio of brilliant performances" and awarding the production 3.5/4 stars.

=== Other worldwide productions ===
In 2013, Sydney Theatre Company presented a production directed by Simon Phillips with a cast featuring Tim Minchin as Rosencrantz and Toby Schmitz as Guildenstern from 6 August to 7 September 2013.

=== Radio adaptations ===
The play has been adapted three times for BBC Radio:

- 24 December 1978, an adaptation by Stoppard himself, directed by John Tydeman; the cast included Edward Petherbridge as Guildenstern, Edward Hardwicke as Rosencrantz, Freddie Jones as The Player, Robert Lang as Claudius, Maxine Audley as Gertrude, Angela Pleasence as Ophelia, and Martin Jarvis as Hamlet.
- 15 July 2007 as part of a celebration of Stoppard's 70th birthday, another version of Stoppard's adaptation, this time directed by Peter Kavanagh; the cast included Danny Webb as Rosencrantz, Andrew Lincoln as Guildenstern, Desmond Barrit as The Player, John Rowe as Polonius, Abigail Hollick as Ophelia, Liza Sadovy as Gertrude, Simon Treves as Claudius and John Dougall as Hamlet.
- A two-part adaptation broadcast 30 and 31 March 2019 on BBC Radio 4, directed by Emma Harding; the cast included Mathew Baynton as Rosencrantz, Andrew Buchan as Guildenstern, Toby Jones as The Player, Sam Dale as Tragedian, Ronny Jhutti as Alfred, Sarah Ovens as Ophelia, Michael Bertenshaw as Polonius, Parth Thakerar as Hamlet, Don Gilet as Claudius and Clare Corbett as Gertrude.

A 1983 radio adaptation was broadcast on the BBC World Service on 17 October directed by Gordon House, with Nigel Anthony as Rosencrantz, Nicky Henson as Guildenstern, Jack May as The Player, John Duttine as Hamlet, Peter Vaughan as Claudius, Marcia Warren as Gertrude, Eileen Tully as Ophelia, Cyril Shaps as Polonius and Alex Jennings as a Tragedian.

In June 2022, a production directed by Rosalind Ayres for the L.A. Theatre Works was broadcast from and recorded at the Invisible Studios, West Hollywood. The cast included Adhir Kalyan as Rosencrantz, Matthew Wolf as Guildenstern, Martin Jarvis as The Player, Anna Lyse Erikson as Alfred/Ophelia, Seamus Dever as Hamlet, JD Cullum as Claudius/Soldier, André Sogliuzzo as Polonius/Player-King/Horatio/Ambassador and Susan Sullivan as Gertrude.

=== Film adaptation ===
Film rights to the play were originally bought by MGM in 1968 for a reported $350,000 plus 10% of the profits. John Boorman was announced as director with Bob Chartoff and Irwin Winkler to produce. The film was not made, however.

The play was eventually adapted for a film released in February 1990, with screenplay and direction by Stoppard. The motion picture is Stoppard's only film directing credit: "[I]t began to become clear that it might be a good idea if I did it myself—at least the director wouldn't have to keep wondering what the author meant. It just seemed that I'd be the only person who could treat the play with the necessary disrespect." The cast included Gary Oldman as Rosencrantz, Tim Roth as Guildenstern, Richard Dreyfuss as the Player, Joanna Roth as Ophelia, Ian Richardson as Polonius, Joanna Miles as Gertrude, Donald Sumpter as Claudius, and Iain Glen as Hamlet.

== Works inspired by Rosencrantz and Guildenstern Are Dead ==
- A 2022 play Rosencrantz & Guildenstern Are (Rosencrantz & Guildenstern Are Dead) is an irreverent and absurd one-act in which Rosencrantz and Guildenstern realize they are characters in a meta-play written by Tom Stoppard. Subsequently he realizes that he is a character in a meta-meta-play written by Etai Shuchatowitz.
- The 2004 Disney direct-to-video film The Lion King 1½ shares many features of Rosencrantz and Guildenstern Are Dead, being a re-telling of the original 1994 film The Lion King (itself based largely on the plot of Hamlet) from the perspective of the characters Timon and Pumbaa and occasionally featuring major characters and plot points from the original film.
- The framing of the 1999 video game Half-Life: Opposing Force was inspired by the play, as stated by one of the lead developers. It is an expansion pack to the original Half-Life that features events and plot points from the original game but retells them from the perspective of a different character, Adrian Shepherd. The 2001 video game Half-Life: Blue Shift, which is about the Black Mesa security guard Barney Calhoun, follows the same pattern.
- The title of the Star Wars comic Tag and Bink are Dead is based on the play's title and it has the similar premise with re-telling of events of Star Wars saga from the point of view of two minor characters.
- The Phineas and Ferb special episode "Phineas and Ferb: Star Wars" is based on ideas from both Rosencrantz and Guildenstern Are Dead and the Tag and Bink comic book.
- Dogberry & Verges Are Scared by Michael Doherty & Will Mobley was inspired by the Stoppard play, but this time references Shakespeare's Much Ado About Nothing.

== Awards and nominations ==
=== Original Broadway production ===
Year	Award	Category	Nominee	Result
1968	Tony Award	Best Play		Won
1968	Tony Award	Best Featured Actor in a Play	Paul Hecht	Nominated
1968	Tony Award	Best Featured Actor in a Play	Brian Murray	Nominated
1968	Tony Award	Best Featured Actor in a Play	John Wood	Nominated
1968	Tony Award	Best Direction of a Play	Derek Goldby	Nominated
1968	Tony Award	Best Scenic Design	Desmond Heeley	Won
1968	Tony Award	Best Costume Design	Desmond Heeley	Won
1968	Tony Award	Best Producer	David Merrick	Won
