= Street Scene (opera) =

Opera by Kurt Weill

- Opera by Kurt Weill
- Sheet music cover
- Librettist: Langston Hughes
- Language: English
- Based on: Street Scene by Elmer Rice
- Premiere: 9 January 1947; Adelphi Theatre, New York City

Street Scene is an American opera by Kurt Weill (music), Langston Hughes (lyrics), and Elmer Rice (book). Written in 1946 and premiered in Philadelphia that year, Street Scene is based on the Pulitzer Prize-winning 1929 play of the same name by Rice.

It was Weill who referred to the piece as an "American opera", intending it as a groundbreaking synthesis of European traditional opera and American musical theater. He received the inaugural Tony Award for Best Original Score for his work, after the Broadway premiere in 1947. Considered far more an opera than a musical, Street Scene is regularly produced by professional opera companies and has never been revived on Broadway. Musically and culturally, even dramatically, the work inhabits the mid-ground between Weill's Threepenny Opera (1928) and Leonard Bernstein's West Side Story (1957).

The score contains operatic arias and ensembles, some of them, such as Anna Maurrant's "Somehow I Never Could Believe" and Frank Maurrant's "Let Things Be Like They Always Was", with links and references to the style of Giacomo Puccini. It also has jazz and blues influences in "I Got a Marble and a Star" and "Lonely House". Some of the more Broadway-style musical numbers are "Wrapped in a Ribbon and Tied in a Bow", "Wouldn't You Like to Be on Broadway?" and "Moon-faced, Starry-eyed", an extended song-and-dance sequence. Benny Goodman and His Orchestra recorded "Moon-Faced, Starry-Eyed" with Johnny Mercer on the vocal in 1947. It was also recorded by the jazz vocal group The Hi-Lo's for their 1958 Columbia LP And All That Jazz.

== Background ==
In Germany in the late 1920s and early 1930s, Weill had already begun to use American jazz and popular song elements in his operas. After fleeing from Nazi Germany in 1933, he worked in Paris, then England, and then, beginning in 1935, in New York. He made a study of American popular and stage music and worked to further adapt his music to new American styles in his writing for Broadway, film and radio. He strove to find a new way of creating an American opera that would be successful both commercially and artistically. Weill wrote:

It's my opinion that we can and will develop a musical-dramatic form in this country (America) but I don't think it will be called 'opera', or that it will grow out of the opera which has become a thing separate from the commercial theater, dependent upon other means than box-office appeal for its continuance. It will develop from and remain a part of the American theater – 'Broadway' theater, if you like. More than anything else, I want to be a part in that development.

Weill sought to create musical theatre that would "integrate drama and music, spoken word, song, and movement." He further wrote:

This form of theater has its special attraction for the composer, because it allows him to use a great variety of musical idioms, to write music that is both serious and light, operatic and popular, emotional and sophisticated, orchestral and vocal. Each show of this type has to create its own style, its own texture, its own relationship between words and music, because music becomes a truly integral part of the play – it helps deepen the emotions and clarify the structure.

Weill saw Rice's naturalistic play in 1930 and wanted to adapt it. As he wrote:

It was a simple story of everyday life in a big city, a story of love and passion and greed and death. I saw great musical possibilities in its theatrical device – life in a tenement house between one evening and the next afternoon. And it seemed like a great challenge to me to find the inherent poetry in these people and to blend my music with the stark realism of the play."

In 1936, Weill met Rice in New York and suggested the adaptation, but Rice turned him down. After the successes of Weill's Knickerbocker Holiday in 1938, Lady in the Dark in 1940, and One Touch of Venus in 1943 (and after Weill had composed incidental music for Rice's Two on an Island in 1939), Weill asked again, and Rice agreed. The two chose Harlem Renaissance poet Langston Hughes to "lift the everyday language of the people into a simple, unsophisticated poetry", as Weill put it.

In order to enhance the realism of the new work, the collaborators utilized dialogue scenes, sometimes underscored by music. To create music that would portray the ethnic melting pot of characters described in Rice's book, Weill travelled to neighborhoods in New York, watching children at play and observing New Yorkers. Hughes took Weill to Harlem nightclubs to hear the newest musical idioms of black American jazz and blues. Hughes wrote: "The resulting song was composed in a national American Negro idiom; but a German, or someone else, could sing it without sounding strange or out of place." Weill and many critics have considered the score to be his masterpiece.

== Production history ==
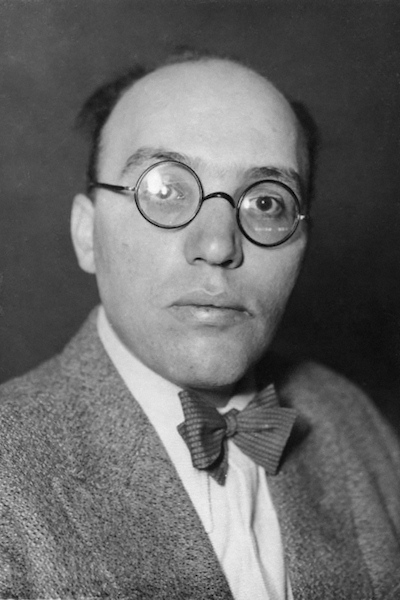
Kurt Weill in 1932

After a tryout in Philadelphia at the Shubert Theatre, which opened Monday, December 16, 1946, revisions were made, and Street Scene opened on Broadway at the Adelphi Theatre on January 9, 1947. It closed on May 17, 1947, after 148 performances, experiencing high running costs. The production was directed by Charles Friedman, with choreography by Anna Sokolow, and produced by Dwight Deere Wiman and the Playwrights' Company (Maxwell Anderson; S. N. Behrman; Elmer Rice; Robert E. Sherwood; Sidney Howard). Scenic and lighting design were by Jo Mielziner; costume design was by Lucinda Ballard. The production starred Anne Jeffreys as Rose Maurrant, Polyna Stoska as Anna Maurrant, Norman Cordon as Frank Maurrant, Brian Sullivan as Sam Kaplan, Hope Emerson as Emma Jones, Sheila Bond as Mae Jones, and Danny Daniels as Dick McGann. Weill received the inaugural Tony Award for Best Original Score, and Ballard received the 1947 Tony Award for Best Costume Design, competing with other strong musicals that year, notably Finian's Rainbow by Burton Lane and Brigadoon by Frederick Loewe. The New York City Opera revived Street Scene several times, notably in 1959, 1979, and 1990.

The British premiere was a one-night only charity performance at the Palace Theatre in London on Sunday 26 April 1987. The show featured a starry cast of principals and walk-ons, including Rosemary Ashe, Maria Friedman, Alec McCowen, Matt Zimmerman, Kevin Colson, Steven Berkoff and Elaine Paige. A production by the English National Opera at the London Coliseum in 1989 included Catherine Zeta-Jones as Mae Jones. It was staged by the Minneapolis-based Minnesota Opera in 2001. Dicapo Opera staged the work in 2002 at the St. Jean Baptiste Church at Lexington Avenue and 76th Street in Manhattan.

The Opera Group, Young Vic, and Watford Palace Theatre gave the first UK production in 20 years in July 2008, winning the Evening Standard Award 2008 for Best Musical. Another production was performed in the grounds of the Old Royal Naval College in Greenwich on July 19, 2008, with the cast largely drawn from students from Trinity College of Music. In 2011, Street Scene was performed by the Opera/Music Theatre Workshop of Southeastern Louisiana University at the Pottle Music Auditorium, and, in German, by the Bayerische Theaterakademie August Everding and the Munich Radio Orchestra, led by Ulf Schirmer. In June the same year, the Semperoper in Dresden produced the work. The first performance in Spain was in March 2013, at the Gran Teatre del Liceu and in 2018 at Teatro Real.

A production by Opera North that opened at the Grand Theatre, Leeds, in January 2020 was favourably reviewed; it ran there until 28 February then went on tour; a Leeds performance was recorded and broadcast by BBC Radio 3 on 11 April 2020. A 2-disc recording was release in 2026 on the Austrian label Capriccio.

== Roles ==
Roles, voice types, premiere cast
Role	Voice type	Premiere cast, 9 January 1947 Conductor: Maurice Abravanel
Maurrant family
Frank Maurrant, a stage hand, emotionally abusive	bass-baritone	Norman Cordon
Anna Maurrant, his gentle, kind wife	dramatic soprano	Polyna Stoska
Rose Maurrant, their 20-year-old daughter, working in an insurance office	lyric soprano	Anne Jeffreys
Willie Maurrant, their mischievous little boy	child, non singing	Peter Griffith
Jones family
Emma Jones, a gossipy neighbor	mezzo-soprano	Hope Emerson
George Jones, her alcoholic husband	baritone	David E. Thomas
Mae Jones, their free spirited teenage daughter	mezzo-soprano	Sheila Bond
Vincent Jones, her thuggish elder brother, a cab driver	speaking role	Robert Pierson
Olsen family
Olga Olsen, a Swedish neighbor	contralto	Ellen Repp
Carl Olsen, her husband	bass	Wilson Smith
Kaplan family
Abraham Kaplan, a radically opinioned elderly Jewish man	baritone	Irving Kaufman
Sam Kaplan, his son, 19 years old, a recent college graduate	tenor	Brian Sullivan
Shirley Kaplan, his elder sister, a school teacher	speaking role	Norma Chambers
Fiorentino family
Greta Fiorentino, a German neighbor	coloratura soprano	Helen Arden
Lippo Fiorentino, her Italian husband, a violinist	tenor	Sydney Rainer
Hildebrand family
Laura Hildebrand, a struggling single mother	speaking role	Elen Lane
Jennie Hildebrand, her teenage daughter	mezzo-soprano	Beverly Janis
Charlie Hildebrand, her young boy	child	Bennett Burrill
Mary Hildebrand, her little girl	child	Juliana Gallagher
Other residents
Daniel Buchanan, an expectant father	tenor	Remo Lota
Henry Davis, the janitor	baritone	Creighton Thompson
Grace Davis, his little girl	child	Helen Ferguson
Visitors to the house
Dick McGann, a romantic interest of Mae Jones	baritone	Danny Daniels
Harry Easter, Rose Maurrant's sleazy boss	baritone	Don Saxon
Steve Sankey, a milkman, supposedly having an affair with Anna Maurrant	speaking role	Lauren Gilbert
Nursemaid #1, a young nursemaid	lyric alto	Peggy Turnley
Nursemaid #2, another young nursemaid	contralto	Ellen Carleen
Dr. John Wilson, the doctor for Daniel Buchanan's pregnant wife	speaking role	Edwin G. O'Connor
Officer Harry Murphy, a policeman	speaking role	Norman Thomson
James Henry, City Marshall	speaking role	Randolphe Symonette
Fred Cullen, his assistant	speaking role	Paul Lily
An Ambulance Driver	speaking role	
Passers-by, children, chorus

== Synopsis ==
=== Summary ===
The opera takes place on the doorstep of a tenement on the East Side of Manhattan on two brutally hot days in 1946. The story focuses on two plotlines: the romance between Rose Maurrant and her neighbor Sam Kaplan; and on the extramarital affair of Rose's mother, Anna, which is eventually discovered by Rose's irritable father, Frank. The show portrays the ordinary romances, squabbles and gossips of the neighbors, as the mounting tensions involving the Maurrant family eventually build into a tragedy of epic proportions.

=== Act 1 ===
As the curtain rises, we are introduced to some of the residents of the apartment block where the action takes place. Emma Jones and Greta Fiorentino lament the incredible heatwave that is gripping New York ("Ain't It Awful, the Heat?"). They are joined by another neighbor Olga Olsen, who tells of the stress of dealing with her newborn baby and her husband Carl, and an old man, Abraham Kaplan, who sings of the murders and scandals in the press, whilst joining in with the opening number. Henry Davis, the janitor, enters from the basement and sings of his ambitions to greater things ("I Got a Marble and a Star"). Young Willie Maurrant enters and calls for his mother, who enters at the window and throws him a dime to buy a soda. The three women (Mrs. Jones, Mrs. Fiorentino and Mrs. Olsen) persuade Mrs. Maurrant to come downstairs and be sociable, and as she descends, they gossip about the rumour that Mrs. Maurrant and Steve Sankey, the milkman, have been having an affair ("Get a Load of that"). Mrs. Maurrant comes down to chat and Mrs. Olsen goes back down to her cellar apartment to tend to her baby. Sam Kaplan comes out of the house and asks after Mrs. Maurrant's daughter, Rose, but she has not got back from work yet. He leaves to go to the library.

Daniel Buchanan enters, jittery; he is nervous because his wife is upstairs about to have a baby. He and the women sing of the perils of childbirth in a short arietta, "When a Woman Has a Baby". Just as he runs upstairs to tend to his wife, Mrs. Maurrant's husband Frank comes home. He mentions that he is going on a business trip to New Haven tomorrow, and argues with his wife about Rose not being home yet ("She Shouldn't Be Staying out Nights"). Fuming, he storms into the house, just as George Jones returns home from work and chats with the ladies for a while. Anna Maurrant sings an aria about the importance of putting your faith in a brighter tomorrow ("Somehow I Never Could Believe"). Steve Sankey enters and a tense scene ensues between him and the suspecting women. Almost immediately after he departs, Mrs. Maurrant heads off in the same direction, under the guise of going to look for her son. Mr. Jones, Mr. Olsen, Mrs. Jones and Mrs. Fiorentino sing more about the scandal ("Whatcha Think of That"). Mrs. Olsen runs in excited and says that she has just seen Sankey and Mrs. Maurrant standing close together around the back of a local warehouse.

Lippo Fiorentino returns home from work with an armful of ice cream cones for everybody. The two Fiorentinos, the two Olsens, Mr. Jones and Henry Davis sing a jubilant sextet praising ice cream ("Ice Cream Sextet"). Maurrant has been watching, and when his wife comes back he questions her about where she has been. She tells him she has been looking for Willie, and Maurrant and Abraham Kaplan argue about parenting, and later economics. Kaplan uses the example of the Hildebrand family who live upstairs, who are run by a struggling single mother who is unable to pay the rent, to illustrate his point. Maurrant and Kaplan's argument almost becomes physical, but the neighbors and Kaplan's granddaughter Shirley hold the two men back. Maurrant sings about how he longs for a return to traditional moral values in "Let Things Be Like they Always Was". Immediately after, Jennie Hildebrand and other high-school girls enter the street coming home from their graduation ceremony. The ensemble sings a jubilant celebration number, "Wrapped in a Ribbon and Tied in a Bow". Steve Sankey's entrance causes an abrupt end to the celebrations. After the awkward silence of the neighbors forces him to leave, Sam brings Willie Maurrant on in tears. Willie has been fighting with a local kid and Sam stepped in to break it up. Mr. Maurrant leaves to go to the local bar to have a drink, warning that there'll be trouble if Rose is not home by the time he gets back, whilst Mrs. Maurrant takes Willie upstairs. As soon as they leave, the neighbors all begin gossiping about the Maurrant family. Sam gets passionately upset, chiding the neighbors for gossiping so much behind their backs, and then storms off.

All the neighbors say goodnight and go to bed, except Mr. Jones, who goes to the bar to shoot some pool. Sam returns onstage and sings of his crippling loneliness ("Lonely House"). Sam goes into the house, then Rose enters with her boss, Harry Easter, who has walked her home. Easter attempts to charm Rose, taking her in his arms and kissing her. He then tries to win her over with a tempting song, promising her that if she were to run away with him he could get her a gig on Broadway ("Wouldn't You Like to Be on Broadway?"). Rose, however, sticks to her convictions, and sings a Cavatina about how she will always choose true love over showy promises ("What Good Would the Moon Be?"). Rose sees her father returning home and tells Easter to leave. Maurrant questions her about who she was talking to, and gets angry when she tells him that they had been out dancing. He goes upstairs to bed, furious. Buchanan rushes out of the house and asks Rose to go and phone the doctor, as his wife's baby is about to be born. He heads back upstairs, and as Rose is leaving, she passes young Mae Jones and her suitor, Dick McGann. The two have been out dancing and are flirting, and they sing a fast-paced jitterbug about their infatuation with one another ("Moon-faced, Starry-eyed"). After they dance on the sidewalk, they passionately run upstairs into the house, after saying a drunken good-night to Rose, who has returned from phoning the doctor.

Mae's brutish elder brother Vincent returns home, and begins harassing Rose. Sam sees him hassling her out of the window, and comes outside to confront him, however Vincent violently lays him out on the sidewalk. Vincent is about to continue his attack when his mother, Mrs. Jones, comes outside to see what the commotion is. He immediately seizes up and innocently goes upstairs at his mother's order. Sam and Rose are left alone, and Sam is embarrassed that he was humiliated by Vincent in front of Rose. Sam laments the terrible strife of living in the slums, but Rose calms him down by reminding him of a poem he once read her ("Remember that I Care"). Dr. Wilson arrives and goes upstairs to tend to Mrs. Buchanan, and Mr. Maurrant calls Rose and tells her to go to bed. Sam and Rose share a kiss on the sidewalk, and then Rose runs up to bed, just as Henry Davis comes upstairs and starts sweeping the stoop for the night ("I Got a Marble and a Star (reprise)"). Rose calls goodnight to Sam from the window and Sam is left alone on the midnight street as the curtain slowly falls to end Act 1.

=== Act 2 ===
Scene 1: Daybreak, the next morning

Mr. Jones drunkenly returns home from the bar and reels into the stinky house. Dr. Wilson leaves the house, telling Buchanan to let his wife get plenty of rest, and Dick McGann and Mae Jones share a much less passionate goodbye in the cold light of day than their energetic exchanges the night before. Willie Maurrant, Charlie and Mary Hildebrand, Henry's daughter Grace, and other local children play an energetic game ("Catch Me if You Can"), which ends in a large scuffle. Rose calls for them to stop it from the window, whilst Sam comes outside and physically breaks the fight up. The children all disperse. Sam and Rose have a brief conversation, as Rose tells him that she has to go to the funeral of the head of her real estate firm this morning. Shirley comes outside and tells Sam to come in for breakfast, as Rose goes back inside to do the dishes. Buchanan comes outside and tells the Fiorentinos that he has had a little baby girl in the night. Mrs. Jones and Mrs. Maurrant enter, and Mrs. Jones asks her about Mrs. Buchanan, who Mrs. Maurrant has been looking after all night. Mrs. Jones leaves to walk her dog, and Mrs. Maurrant leaves to go to the grocery store. Rose and Mr. Maurrant come out of the house and Rose tries to persuade him to be nicer to her mother. Mrs. Maurrant returns and the three have a family argument about Mr. Maurrant's behaviour. Mrs. Maurrant asks him nonchalantly how long he will be gone on his business trip for, and Mr. Maurrant accuses her of having an affair, which she denies. He leaves in a rage, and Mrs. Maurrant and Rose lament his behaviour ("There'll Be Trouble"). Willie comes on and Rose chides him for looking scruffy. Willie and Rose have a verbal disagreement and Rose quickly storms into the house. Mrs. Maurrant tells him that that is no way to talk to his sister, and that she is relying on him to turn into a good man when he is older ("A Boy Like You"). Willie leaves for school and Mrs. Maurrant goes into the house, as Rose comes out. Shirley Kaplan comes out of the house and asks Rose why she spends so much time with Sam, when he should be concentrating on his work. Shirley leaves for work, and Vincent Jones comes out of the house and starts harassing Rose again, but promptly leaves as Sam comes out of the house. Rose mentions Easter's tempting offer of running away to Sam, and Sam gets upset, saying that she would be better off running away with him, and the two sing of their intention to run away together ("We'll Go Away Together"). Easter arrives to walk Rose to the funeral, and the two leave. Sam goes into the house, as Sankey appears. Mrs. Maurrant appears at her window and tells him to come upstairs, as Mr. Maurrant has gone on his business trip and Rose will be at the funeral all morning. As Sankey hurries upstairs he passes Sam coming out of the house, who looks up at the window and sees Mrs. Maurrant pulling the shades shut. Sam sits on the stoop and reads a book, as James Henry, a city-marshall, and Fred Cullen, his assistant, appear. They call Henry Davis up and tell him that they are here to dispossess the Hildebrand family, and that since she has made no arrangements to have the furniture taken away, they will have to dump it on the sidewalk. Henry goes back into the cellar as the two men enter the house. Mr. Maurrant returns, having changed his mind about the business trip. He sees the shades pulled shut and becomes furious. Sam pleads with him not to enter the house but he pushes him aside and runs upstairs. Mrs. Maurrant is heard screaming, and then two gunshots. Sankey appears at the window in terror, he tries to escape but Maurrant pulls him back inside and shoots him. Panic ensues, as Maurrant exits the house, covered in blood, and points his revolver at the crowd of gatherers in order to make his escape. Policemen, paramedics, concerned neighbors flood the scene. Rose returns from the funeral and sees the concerned crowd. Sam tries to keep her back but she cannot be restrained. The ensemble sings a tragic chorus number about the killing, "The Woman Who Lived up There". Mrs. Maurrant's body is brought out of the house on a stretcher and taken to the hospital and the citizens rush after the ambulance, as Rose, quietly crying in Sam's arms, follows. The curtain slowly falls as the two city-marshalls continue bringing the Hildebrand furniture out onto the sidewalk.

Scene 2: Mid-afternoon, the same day

Two young nursemaids appear at the house and sing about the scandal of the murder that has already spread around the city, as they try to quiet the children they are looking after ("Lullaby"). As the nursemaids leave, Rose enters, dressed in black. She asks Officer Murphy, the policeman who is still in her apartment, if they have found her father yet, and he tells her that they have not. Sam enters and tells Rose that he has taken Willie from school round to her aunt's house. Shirley enters and expresses her condolences to Rose, and the two of them go up to Rose's apartment together, as Rose is afraid to go up alone. Sam tells his grandfather that the police are going to make him testify against Maurrant, when two shots are heard in the distance. Buchanan and Olsen run on and tell Sam and Rose (who has run out of the house, alerted by the noise) that the police have found her father hiding in the basement of a house down the street. Two policemen bring on Maurrant, who is covered in blood and dirt. The officers are taking him away when he begs for one minute with his daughter, which they grant him. He and Rose talk about the murder, as the crowd looks on ("He Loved Her Too"). The officers take Maurrant off, and Rose and Sam are left alone onstage. Rose starts to enter the house when Sam asks what she is going to do. She tells him she will go away, but when he says that he will go with her as they discussed that morning, Rose says she has to go off alone. Sam finally confesses to Rose that he is in love with her, and that his life is nothing without her. Rose says that her parents have proved that two people do not belong together, and she says goodbye to Sam ("Don't Forget the Lilac Bush"). Shirley comes out of the house and hands Rose a suitcase full of her things. Rose starts walking off, then returns and swiftly kisses Sam, but he breaks away and goes abruptly into the house. Rose stands looking after him, then picks up her bag and walks off. Mrs. Fiorentino, Mrs. Olsen and Mrs. Jones appear and immediately begin gossiping about Rose and Easter hanging around on the street late last night ("Ain't It Awful, the Heat? (reprise)"), as they once again lament the unbearable heat and the curtain slowly falls.

==== Songs ====
Act 1

- "Ain't It Awful, the Heat?" – Greta Fiorentino, Emma Jones, Olga and Carl Olsen, Abraham Kaplan
- "I Got a Marble and a Star" – Henry Davis
- "Get a Load of That" – Emma Jones, Greta Fiorentino, Olga Olsen
- "When a Woman Has a Baby" – Daniel Buchanan, Greta Fiorentino, Emma Jones, Anna Maurrant
- "She Shouldn't Be Staying out Nights" – Frank and Anna Maurrant, Greta Fiorentino
- "Somehow I Never Could Believe" – Anna Maurrant
- "Whatcha Think of That?" – Emma and George Jones, Carl Olsen, Greta Fiorentino
- "Ice Cream Sextet" – Lippo and Greta Fiorentino, Carl and Olga Olsen, George Jones, Henry Davis
- "Let Things Be Like They Always Was" – Frank Maurrant
- "Wrapped in a Ribbon and Tied in a Bow" – Jennie Hildebrand, Ensemble
- "Lonely House" – Sam Kaplan
- "Wouldn't You Like to Be on Broadway?" – Harry Easter
- "What Good Would the Moon Be?" – Rose Maurrant
- "Moon-faced, Starry-eyed" – Dick McGann, Mae Jones
- "Remember That I Care" – Sam Kaplan, Rose Maurrant
- "I Got a Marble and a Star (reprise)" – Henry Davis

Act 2

- "Catch Me if You Can" – Charlie and Mary Hildebrand, Willie Maurrant, Grace Davis, Children
- "There'll Be Trouble" – Frank, Rose and Anna Maurrant
- "A Boy Like You" – Anna Maurrant
- "We'll Go Away Together" – Rose Maurrant, Sam Kaplan
- "The Woman Who Lived up There" – Ensemble
- "Lullaby" – Nursemaid #1, Nursemaid #2
- "I Loved Her, Too" – Frank and Rose Maurrant, Ensemble
- "Don't Forget the Lilac Bush" – Sam Kaplan, Rose Maurrant
- "Ain't it Awful, the Heat? (reprise)" – Greta Fiorentino, Emma Jones, Olga Olsen, Abraham Kaplan

== Awards and nominations ==
=== Original Broadway production ===
Year	Award	Category	Nominee	Result
1947	Tony Award	Best Original Score	Kurt Weill	Won
1947	Tony Award	Best Costume Design	Lucinda Ballard	Won
