= Another Part of the Forest =

Play written by Lillian Hellman

- Original Playbill
- Original language: English
- Written by: Lillian Hellman
- Subject: The Hubbard family and their rise to prominence
- Genre: Drama
- Setting: Bowden, Alabama

Premiere
- Date: November 20, 1946
- Place: Fulton Theatre, New York City

Another Part of the Forest is a 1946 play by Lillian Hellman, a prequel to her 1939 drama The Little Foxes.

== Plot synopsis ==
Set in the fictional town of Bowden, Alabama, in June 1880, the plot focuses on the wealthy, ruthless, and innately evil Hubbard family and their rise to prominence. Patriarch Marcus Hubbard was born into poverty and toiled at menial labor while teaching himself Greek philosophy and the basics of business acumen. He ultimately made his fortune by exploiting his fellow Southerners during the American Civil War. He treats his good-hearted but slightly eccentric Bible-quoting wife Lavinia in a way designed to undermine both her self-confidence and sense of reality; she is no help to her children and wants nothing more than to join a religious retreat so she can expiate her sins.

Shrewd, amoral elder son Benjamin is plotting to usurp his father's power and steal his money, and the younger Oscar lusts for "cooch dancer" (as she's described by Regina) Laurette Sincee rather than penniless neighbor Birdie Bagtry, who desperately is looking for a loan on her family's valuable land, a situation Benjamin hopes to exploit.

Regina is the sexually active daughter who wants to live in Chicago with Birdie's cousin, former Confederate officer John Bagtry, a move discouraged by her father, who has a disturbingly unnatural closeness to the girl. The only people in the household with any sense of morality are the servants, Coralee and Jacob.

== Original Broadway production ==
Hellman directed the Broadway production that opened on November 20, 1946, at the Fulton Theatre, where it ran for 182 performances. Incidental music was composed by Marc Blitzstein, the scenic and lighting design were by Jo Mielziner, and the costume design was by Lucinda Ballard.

=== Principal opening night cast ===
Patricia Neal as Regina Hubbard

- Patricia Neal as Regina Hubbard
- Percy Waram as Marcus Hubbard
- Mildred Dunnock as Lavinia Hubbard
- Leo Genn as Benjamin Hubbard
- Scott McKay as Oscar Hubbard
- Margaret Phillips as Birdie Bagtry
- Bartlett Robinson as John Bagtry
- Jean Hagen as Laurette Sincee
- Beatrice Thompson as Coralee
- Stanley Greene as Jacob
- Owen Coll as Simon Isham
- Paul Ford as Harold Penniman
- Gene O'Donnell as Gilbert Jugger

=== Awards and nominations ===
Patricia Neal, making her Broadway debut, won both the Tony Award for Best Performance by a Featured Actress in a Play and the Theatre World Award, and Lucinda Ballard won the Tony Award for Best Costume Design. Margaret Phillips won the Clarence Derwent Award for Most Promising Female.

== Adaptations ==
Vladimir Pozner adapted Hellman's play for a 1948 feature film directed by Michael Gordon.

A 1972 PBS broadcast directed by Daniel Mann starred Barry Sullivan as Marcus, Dorothy McGuire as Lavinia, Robert Foxworth as Benjamin, Andrew Prine as Oscar, Tiffany Bolling as Regina, Tisha Sterling as Birdie, William Bassett as Bagtry, and Lane Bradbury as Laurette.
