= Jules Leventhal =

American theatre producer

- Born: November 29, 1888; Russia
- Died: April 13, 1949 (aged 60); New York, U.S.
- Occupation: Theatre producer

Jules Leventhal (November 29, 1888 – April 13, 1949) was an American theatre producer. He was given the Special Tony Award at the 1st Tony Awards.
