= Randy Barceló =

Costume designer, set designer, photographer, interior designer and artist

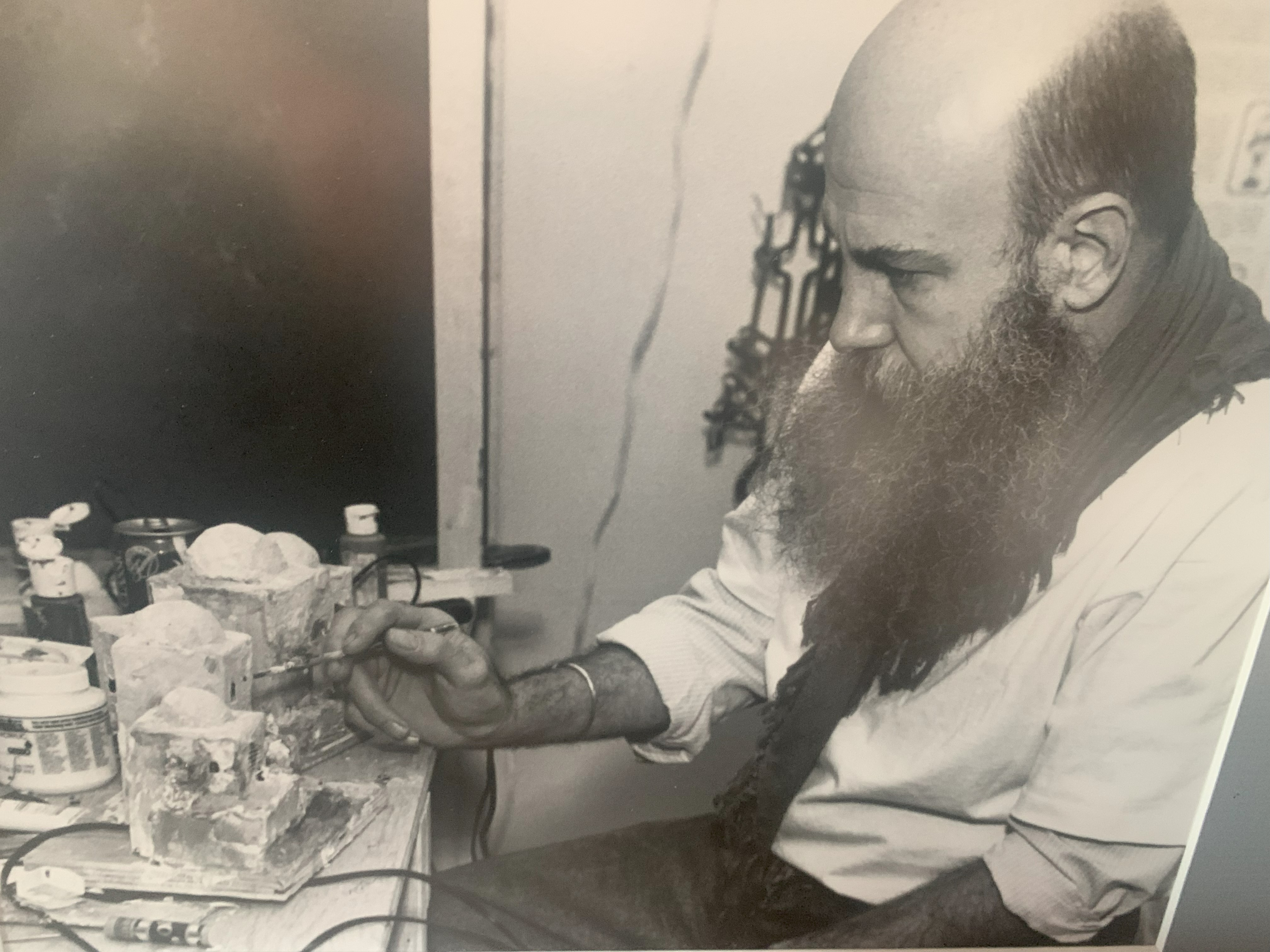
- NY studio circa 1989
- Born: September 19, 1946; Havana, Cuba
- Died: December 6, 1994 (aged 48)
- Education: Lester Polakov Studio and Forum of Stage Design
- Occupations: Costume designer, set designer, interior designer, dancer, photographer
- Parent(s): Ramón Barceló (Father); Ondina López (Mother)
- Awards: Nominated for a Tony Award

Randy Barceló (September 19, 1946 – December 6, 1994) was a Cuban dancer, photographer, interior designer, and all-around artist. He was also known for his set and costume designs for theatre and film.

== Biography ==
Born in Havana on September 19, 1946, Randy Barceló left Cuba through Operation Pedro Pan at the age of 14. He studied art at University of Puerto Rico and in 1965 moved to New York where he enrolled in the Lester Polakov Studio and Forum of Stage Design.

Barceló began his career as a dancer and choreographer. At the age of 24, he worked as a designer for the Broadway musical, 'Lenny'. In 1972 he designed the costumes for Jesus Christ Superstar and was nominated for a Tony Award, the first Hispanic nominee for costume design. He went on to design costumes for several on- and off- Broadway plays and musicals, ballet and dance productions, and operas.

Barceló's art-work, primarily abstract and figurative sketches and paintings, have been shown in several galleries and museums including the Cooper Hewitt Museum, Hudson River Museum, and Kennedy Center for Performing Arts.

In 1994, Barceló designed costumes for ¡Si Señor! ¡Es Mi Son!, choreographed for Ballet Hispanico by Alberto Alonso and Sonia Calero with music by Gloria Estefan. These were his final designs as he died of cancer on December 6 of that same year.

== Works or publications ==
- 1977-1978: Richard III. University of Wisconsin-Milwaukee Libraries. 1977. OCLC 272396284.
- A Midsummer Night's Dream. New York. OCLC 84859948.
- Ailey Celebrates Ellington. [Unedited Footage, Takes 101-121]. 1974. OCLC 52629870.
- Ain't Misbehavin'. Burbank, Calif. 1982. OCLC 52552931.
- Ain't Misbehavin' (Videotape). 1982. OCLC 80893673.
- Canciones de la vellonera. Princeton, NJ: Libretoas. 1996. OCLC 35621288.
- Crossword [excerpt]. 1977. OCLC 80535999.
- Ellington the Music Lives On. New York: WNET. 1983. OCLC 591535801.
- For Bird with Love. [place of publication not identified]: ArtHaus Musik. 1990. OCLC 781679907.
- Jennifer Muller and the Works. 1980. OCLC 36192934.
- Los Dos mundos de Angelita The two worlds of Angelita. New York, N.Y.: First Run/Icarus Films. 1982. OCLC 82639175.
- Mrs. Farmer's Daughter. 1983. OCLC 79942604.
- Randy Barcelo : Memorias. [place of publication not identified]: [publisher not identified]. 1996. OCLC 56472774.
- Randy Barceló conquista a Broadway : Randy Barceló 1946-1994 : el Museo de Arte Contemporáneo de Puerto Rico, 6 de febrero al 28 de marzo de 1998. San Juan, Puerto Rico: Museo de Arte Contemporáneo de Puerto Rico. 1998. OCLC 415710247.
- The Extravagant Triumph of Jesus Christ, Karl Marx, and William Shakespeare. 1982. OCLC 77741304.
- The Magic of Katherine Dunham. 1987. OCLC 44004944.

=== Randy Barceló’s Production Credits ===
==== Broadway ====
- Ain't Misbehavin', 1978
- Ain't Misbehavin', 1988
- A Broadway Musical, 1978
- Dude 1972
- Jesus Christ Superstar, 1971
- Lenny, 1971
- The Leaf People, 1975 (costumes and make-up)
- The Magic Show, 1974
- Mayor, 1985 (sets and costumes)
- The Night That Made America Famous, 1975
- Senator Joe, 1989 (never officially opened)
- Sergeant Pepper's Lonely Hearts Club Band

===== Off-Broadway =====
- Blood Wedding, INTAR Theatre (sets and costumes)
- Caligula, La Mama Experimental Theatre Club
- Cracks, Theatre De Lys, 1976
- Lady Day, Chelsea Theatre Center
- Mayor, Village Gate Theatre (sets and costumes)
- A Midsummer Night's Dream, New York Shakespeare Festival, Delacorte Theatre, 1982
- The Moondreamers, La Mama Experimental Theatre Club
- Phillip Morris Superband Series, Beacon Theatre (set)
- Rice and Beans, INTAR Theatre (sets and costumes)
- Spookhouse, Playhouse 91, 1984
- The Tempest, LaMama Experimental Theatre Club

===== Opera =====
- L'Histoire du Soldat, Carnegie Hall (sets and costumes)
- Les Troyen, Vienna State Opera
- Lily, New York City Opera
- Mass, Leonard Bernstein, Kennedy Center
- Salome, New York City Opera

===== Ballet and Dance =====
- Black, Brown & Beige, Alvin Ailey Dance Theatre, 1976
- The Blues Ain't, Alvin Ailey Dance Theatre, 1974
- Crosswords, Alvin Ailey Dance Theatre
- La Dea delle Acque, Alvin Ailey for La Scala Opera Ballet, 1988
- For "Bird" – With Love, Alvin Ailey Dance Theatre, 1984
- Fuenteovejuna, Ballet Hispanico
- Lovers, Jennifer Muller (sets and costumes)
- Mondrian, Jennifer Muller (sets and costumes)
- The Mooche, Alvin Ailey Dance Theatre, 1974
- Opus McShann, Alvin Ailey Dance Theatre, 1988
- Predicaments for Five, Jennifer Muller (sets and costumes)
- ¡Si Señor! ¡Es Mi Son!, Ballet Hispanico, 1994
- Spell, Alvin Ailey Dance Theatre, 1981
- The Street Dancer, Ballet Hispanico,

===== Television =====
- Ailey Celebrates Ellington, Alvin Ailey for CBS, 1975
- Ain't Misbehavin', NBC, 1982
- Duke Ellington: The Music Lives On, PBS, 1983

===== Film =====
- Body Passion, 1987 (production designer)
- The Cop and the Anthem
- Cubanos (art direction and costumes)
- Fat Chance (set and costumes for theater sequence)
- Fatal Encounter, 1981
- Secret Life of Plants (costumes for dance sequence)
- Tainted, 1988 (art direction and costumes)
- Los Dos Mundos de Angelita, 1984 (art direction and costumes)
- Welcome to Miami (art direction and costumes)
- When the Mountains Tremble, 1983 (production designer)
