= Lucinda Ballard =

American costume designer (1906–1993)

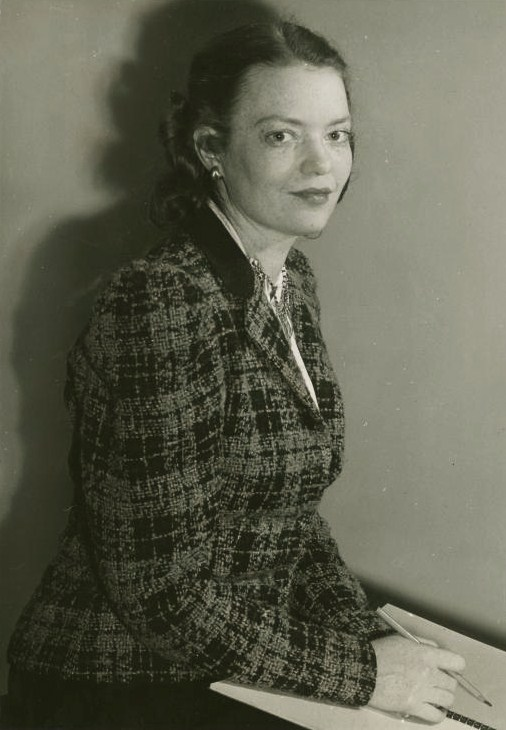
Ballard in 1940

Lucinda Ballard (born Lucinda Davis Goldsborough; April 3, 1906 – August 19, 1993) was an American costume designer who worked primarily in Broadway theatre.

== Biography ==
Born Lucinda Davis Goldsborough in New Orleans, Louisiana, Ballard studied at the Art Students League in New York City. Her first professional credits was as the scenic and costume designer for a 1937 production of As You Like It. In 1945, she won the Donaldson Award for the costumes she designed for I Remember Mama. Two years later she was the first person to win the Tony Award for Best Costume Design, an acknowledgement of her contributions to Another Part of the Forest, Street Scene, and The Chocolate Soldier, among others. Her second Tony was for the 1961 musical The Gay Life. Additional theatre credits include Annie Get Your Gun, Allegro, A Streetcar Named Desire, Flahooley, The Fourposter, Carnival in Flanders, Cat on a Hot Tin Roof, Orpheus Descending, and The Sound of Music.

Ballard designed only two films, Portrait of Jennie and the 1951 screen adaptation of A Streetcar Named Desire, for which she was nominated for the Academy Award for Best Costume Design.

Ballard and her first husband, William Fitz Randolph Ballard, divorced in 1938 after eight years of marriage. They had two children, Robert F. R. Ballard (1933-1923) and Lucinda Jenifer Ballard Ramberg (1934-1989). In 1951, she married lyricist Howard Dietz, and the couple resided in Sands Point, New York, until his death in 1983.

Ballard died of cancer at the age of 87 in New York City.
