= Noon (play) =

One-act play by Terrence McNally

Noon is a one-act play by Terrence McNally. It constitutes the second segment of the trilogy Morning, Noon and Night, which premiered on Broadway in 1968.

== Production ==
Morning, Noon and Night was presented by the Circle in the Square Theatre company on Broadway at the Henry Miller Theatre on November 28, 1968, and closed on January 11, 1969. The trio of plays was written specifically for Circle in the Square. Directed by Theodore Mann, the cast starred John Heffernan, Robert Klein, Charlotte Rae, Sorrell Booke and Jane Marla Robbins.

The other two plays were by Israel Horovitz (Morning) and Leonard Melfi (Night).

== Plot ==
The play is a sexual farce involving five very different people lured to a New York loft in expectation of a sexual adventure.

== Critical response ==
As Theodore Mann relates: "The New York Times review found the whole evening unsatisfactory..." but the New York Post "loved it". Mann further notes that they reduced ticket prices, but then after raising prices, the audiences stopped coming.

However, in Clive Barnes review for The New York Times he appears to have some praise for the plays. He wrote that the plays had "all the shocking trappings...is by turn thoughtful and dazzling, witty, provocative and, in the final play, even poetic...The whole program...is something of an exercise in skim-skating over the thin ice of good taste... McNally is much, much funnier..." than his last play, Witness.

== Awards and nominations ==
The play received two 1969 Tony Awards nominations: Best Actress in a Play (Charlotte Rae) and Best Costume Design (Michael Annals).
