= Drama Desk Award for Outstanding Costume Design =

American theatre award

- Awarded for: Outstanding Costume Design
- Location: New York City
- Country: United States
- Presented by: Drama Desk
- First award: 1969
- Final award: 2015
- Website: dramadesk.org (defunct)

The Drama Desk Award for Outstanding Costume Design was an annual award presented by Drama Desk in recognition of achievements in the theatre across collective Broadway, off-Broadway and off-off-Broadway productions in New York City. The award was first presented in 1969, for work in either a play or musical production. It was retired after the 2015 presentation, replaced by separate play and musical categories.

== Winners and nominees ==
Key

and bold indicates the winner.

=== 1960s ===
Year	Designer	Production	Ref.
1969
1969	**Tanya Moiseiwitsch**	**The House of Atreus**	
1969	**Patricia Zipprodt**	**1776**	
1969	**Patricia Zipprodt**	**Zorba**	

=== 1970s ===
Year	Designer	Production	Ref.
1970
1970	**Theoni V. Aldredge**	**Peer Gynt**	
1970	**Willa Kim**	**Promenade**	
1970	**Willa Kim**	**Operation Sidewinder**	
1970	**Freddy Wittop**	**A Patriot for Me**	
1971
1971	**Florence Klotz**	**Follies**	
1971	**Raoul Pene Du Bois**	**No, No, Nanette**	
1972
1972	**Theoni V. Aldredge**	**Two Gentlemen of Verona**	
1972	**Willa Kim**	**The Screens**	
1973
1973	**Theoni V. Aldredge**	**Much Ado About Nothing**	
1973	**Patricia Zipprodt**	**Pippin**	
1974
1974	**Franne Lee**	**Candide**	
1974	**Carrie Robbins**	**Over Here!**	
1974	**Carrie Robbins**	**The Iceman Cometh**	
1975
1975	**Geoffrey Holder**	**The Wiz**	
1975	Willa Kim	Goodtime Charley	
1975	John Napier	Equus	
1975	Carl Toms	Sherlock Holmes	
1975	Fred Voelpel	Seascape	
1976
1976	**Florence Klotz**	**Pacific Overtures**	
1976	Theoni V. Aldredge	Trelawny of the 'Wells'	
1976	Bernard Johnson	Bubbling Brown Sugar	
1976	Ann Roth	The Royal Family	
1976	Albert Wolsky	A Memory of Two Mondays / 27 Wagons Full of Cotton	
1976	Albert Wolsky	They Knew What They Wanted	
1977
1977	**Theoni V. Aldredge**	**Annie**	
1977	John Gunter	Comedians	
1977	Carol Oditz	The Crazy Locomotive	
1977	Nancy Potts	Porgy and Bess	
1977	Albert Wolsky	Sly Fox	
1978
1978	**Florence Klotz**	**On the Twentieth Century**	
1978	Zack Brown	Saint Joan	
1978	Zack Brown	Tartuffe	
1978	Edward Gorey	Dracula	
1978	Geoffrey Holder	Timbuktu!	
1979
1979	**Patricia Zipprodt**	**King of Hearts**	
1979	Theoni V. Aldredge	Ballroom	
1979	Franne Lee	Sweeney Todd: The Demon Barber of Fleet Street	
1979	Steven Rubin	On Golden Pond	
1979	Julie Weiss	The Elephant Man	

=== 1980s ===
Year	Designer	Production	Ref.
1980
1980	**Pierre Balmain**	**Happy New Year**	
1980	Rostislav Doboujinsky	Heartaches of a Pussycat	
1980	Tazeena Firth and Timothy O'Brien	Evita	
1980	Linda Fisher	Morning's at Seven	
1980	William Ivey Long	The 1940's Radio Hour	
1981
1981	**Theoni V. Aldredge**	**42nd Street**	
1981	**Patricia McGourty**	**The Pirates of Penzance**	
1981	Theoni V. Aldredge	Onward Victoria	
1981	John Bury	Amadeus	
1981	Patricia Zipprodt	Fools	
1982
1982	**William Ivey Long**	**Nine**	
1982	Theoni V. Aldredge	Dreamgirls	
1982	Robert Fletcher	Othello	
1983
1983	**John Napier**	**Cats**	
1983	Zack Brown	On Your Toes	
1983	Patricia McGourty	Death of Von Richthofen Witnessed from Earth	
1983	Rita Ryack	My One and Only	
1983	Patricia Zipprodt	Alice in Wonderland	
1984
1984	**Theoni V. Aldredge**	**La Cage aux Folles**	
1984	Jane Greenwood	The Golden Age	
1984	Ann Hould-Ward and Patricia Zipprodt	Sunday in the Park with George	
1984	Gene Lakin	Ah, Wilderness!	
1985
1985	**Alexander Reid**	**Much Ado About Nothing**	
1985	Patricia McGourty	Big River	
1985	Robert Morgan	The Loves of Anatol	
1985	Carrie Robbins	The Octette Bridge Club	
1985	Ann Roth	Design for Living	
1985	Rita Ryack	Digby	
1986
1986	**Lindsay W. Davis**	**The Mystery of Edwin Drood**	
1986	Joseph G. Aulisi	Precious Sons	
1986	Jane Greenwood	The Iceman Cometh	
1987
1987	**John Napier**	**Starlight Express**	
1987	Bob Crowley	Les Liaisons Dangereuses	
1987	Ann Curtis	Me and My Girl	
1987	William Ivey Long	Smile	
1988
1988	**Maria Björnson**	**The Phantom of the Opera**	
1988	Ann Hould-Ward	Into the Woods	
1988	Eiko Ishioka	M. Butterfly	
1988	Tony Walton	Anything Goes	
1989
1989	**William Ivey Long**	**Lend Me a Tenor**	
1989	Joseph G. Aulisi	Rumors	
1989	Willa Kim	Legs Diamond	

=== 1990s ===
Year	Designer	Production	Ref.
1990
1990	**Santo Loquasto**	**Grand Hotel**	
1990	Jess Goldstein	When She Danced	
1990	Florence Klotz	City of Angels	
1990	Robert Locke and Jennifer Arnold	The Lady in Question	
1991
1991	**Patricia Zipprodt**	**Shogun: The Musical**	
1991	Richard Hudson	La Bête	
1991	Toni-Leslie James, Stephen Kaplin and Barbara Pollitt	Caucasian Chalk Circle	
1991	Santo Loquasto	Lost in Yonkers	
1992
1992	**William Ivey Long**	**Guys and Dolls**	
1992	Gabriel Berry	'Tis Pity She's a Whore	
1992	Toni-Leslie James	Jelly's Last Jam	
1992	William Ivey Long	Crazy for You	
1993
1993	**Florence Klotz**	**Kiss of the Spider Woman**	
1993	Marie-Helene Bouvet and Nathalie Thomas	Les Atrides	
1993	Elizabeth Fried	Brother Truckers	
1993	Melina Root	As You Like It	
1994
1994	**Howard Crabtree**	**Whoop-Dee-Doo!**	
1994	Jane Greenwood	Passion	
1994	Bob Mackie	The Best Little Whorehouse Goes Public	
1994	Patricia Zipprodt	My Fair Lady	
1995
1995	**Florence Klotz**	**Show Boat**	
1995	Judith Dolan	The Petrified Prince	
1995	Jess Goldstein	Love! Valour! Compassion!	
1995	Jane Greenwood	The Heiress	
1995	Stephen Brimson Lewis	Indiscretions	
1995	William Ivey Long	A Christmas Carol	
1996
1996	**Roger Kirk**	**The King and I**	
1996	Jane Greenwood	Sylvia	
1996	Constance Hoffman and Julie Taymor	The Green Bird	
1996	Toni-Leslie James	The Tempest	
1996	Michael Krass	Entertaining Mr Sloane	
1996	Angel Wendt	Rent	
1997
1997	**Howard Crabtree**	**When Pigs Fly**	
1997	Marina Draghici	The Skriker	
1997	Michael Krass	The Rehearsal	
1997	G.W. Mercier and Julie Taymor	Juan Darién: A Carnival Mass	
1997	Martin Pakledinaz	The Life	
1997	Ann Roth	Present Laughter	
1998
1998	**Julie Taymor**	**The Lion King**	
1998	Argemira Affonso	Forever Tango	
1998	William Ivey Long	Cabaret	
1998	Santo Loquasto	Ragtime	
1998	Catherine Zuber	Ivanov	
1998	Catherine Zuber	Triumph of Love	
1999
1999	**Lez Brotherston**	**Matthew Bourne's Swan Lake**	
1999	Alvin Colt	Forbidden Broadway Cleans Up Its Act	
1999	Jess Goldstein	The Mineola Twins	
1999	William Ivey Long	The Mystery of Irma Vep	
1999	John David Ridge	Ring Round the Moon	
1999	Catherine Zuber	Twelfth Night	

=== 2000s ===
Year	Designer	Production	Ref.
2000
2000	**Martin Pakledinaz**	**Kiss Me, Kate**	
2000	Jonathan Bixby and Gregory Gale	The Country Club	
2000	Boyd Graham	The Big Bang	
2000	William Ivey Long	The Music Man	
2000	Martin Pakledinaz	The Wild Party	
2000	Kevin Pollard	Shockheaded Peter	
2001
2001	**William Ivey Long**	**The Producers**	
2001	Linda Cho	Princess Turandot	
2001	Roger Kirk	42nd Street	
2001	Bob Mackie	Pete 'n' Keely	
2001	Chris March, Dana Peter Porras and Richard Sanchez	Christmas with the Crawfords	
2001	Anthony Powell	The Adventures of Tom Sawyer	
2002
2002	**Isaac Mizrahi**	**The Women**	
2002	Jenny Beavan	Private Lives	
2002	Bob Crowley	Sweet Smell of Success	
2002	Susan Hilferty	Into the Woods	
2002	Dick Magnanti	Reefer Madness	
2002	Martin Pakledinaz	Thoroughly Modern Millie	
2003
2003	**William Ivey Long**	**Hairspray**	
2003	Michael Bottari and Ronald Case	Shanghai Moon	
2003	Jess Goldstein	Enchanted April	
2003	Eiko Ishioka	Cirque du Soleil: Varekai	
2003	Catherine Martin and Angus Strathie	La Bohème	
2003	Catherine Zuber	Dinner at Eight	
2004
2004	**Susan Hilferty**	**Wicked**	
2004	Jess Goldstein	Henry IV	
2004	Jenny Mannis	Animal Farm	
2004	Robert A. Prior and Lisa Leighton	Ramayana 2K3	
2004	Mark Thompson	Bombay Dreams	
2004	Catherine Zuber	Intimate Apparel	
2005
2005	**Tim Hatley**	**Monty Python's Spamalot**	
2005	Lez Brotherston	Play Without Words	
2005	William Ivey Long	La Cage aux Folles	
2005	Jeff Mahshie	Hurlyburly	
2005	Anthony Ward	Chitty Chitty Bang Bang	
2005	Catherine Zuber	The Light in the Piazza	
2006
2006	**Gregg Barnes**	**The Drowsy Chaperone**	
2006	Eric Becker	Abigail's Party	
2006	Gregory Gale	The Wedding Singer	
2006	William Ivey Long	Grey Gardens	
2006	Jacques Reynaud	Peer Gynt	
2006	Anita Yavich	The Wooden Breeks	
2007
2007	**Catherine Zuber**	**The Coast of Utopia**	
2007	Mara Blumenfeld	Lookingglass Alice	
2007	Judith Dolan	LoveMusik	
2007	William Ivey Long	Curtains	
2007	Santo Loquasto	Suddenly, Last Summer	
2007	Robert Morgan	Dr. Seuss' How the Grinch Stole Christmas!	
2008
2008	**Katrina Lindsay**	**Les Liaisons Dangereuses**	
2008	Mara Blumenfeld	The Glorious Ones	
2008	Michael Bottari, Ronald Case and Jessica Jahn	Die, Mommie, Die!	
2008	Ann Hould-Ward	A Catered Affair	
2008	Ana Kuzmanic	August: Osage County	
2008	William Ivey Long	Young Frankenstein	
2009
2009	**Tim Hatley**	**Shrek the Musical**	
2009	Rob Howell	The Norman Conquests	
2009	William Ivey Long	9 to 5	
2009	Michael McDonald	Hair	
2009	Martin Pakledinaz	Blithe Spirit	
2009	Carrie Robbins	Irving Berlin's White Christmas	

=== 2010s ===
Year	Designer	Production	Ref.
2010
2010	**Matthew Wright**	**La Cage aux Folles**	
2010	Antonia Ford-Roberts and Bob Flanagan	The Emperor Jones	
2010	Clint Ramos	So Help Me God!	
2010	Bobby Frederick Tilley II	Lizzie Borden	
2010	David Zinn	In the Next Room	
2011
2011	**Tim Chappel and Lizzy Gardiner**	**Priscilla, Queen of the Desert**	
2011	**Desmond Heeley**	**The Importance of Being Earnest**	
2011	Ann Hould-Ward	A Free Man of Color	
2011	Martin Pakledinaz	Anything Goes	
2011	Ann Roth	The Book of Mormon	
2011	Paloma Young	Peter and the Starcatcher	
2012
2012	**Gregg Barnes**	**Follies**	
2012	ESosa	By the Way, Meet Vera Stark	
2012	William Ivey Long	Lucky Guy	
2012	Jessica Pabst	She Kills Monsters	
2012	Martin Pakledinaz	Nice Work If You Can Get It	
2012	Catherine Zuber	Death Takes a Holiday	
2013
2013	**William Ivey Long**	**Rodgers + Hammerstein's Cinderella**	
2013	Amy Clark and Martin Pakledinaz	Chaplin	
2013	Dominique Lemieux	Pippin	
2013	Chris March	Chris March's The Butt-Cracker Suite! A Trailer Park Ballet	
2013	Loren Shaw	Restoration Comedy	
2013	Paloma Young	Natasha, Pierre and the Great Comet of 1812	
2014
2014	**William Ivey Long**	**Bullets Over Broadway**	
2014	Constance Hoffman	A Midsummer Night's Dream	
2014	Zane Pihlstrom	Nutcracker Rouge	
2014	Loren Shaw	The Mysteries	
2014	Jenny Tiramani	Twelfth Night	
2014	David C. Woolard	The Heir Apparent	
2015
2015	**Catherine Zuber**	**Gigi**	
2015	Bob Crowley	An American in Paris	
2015	Bob Crowley	The Audience	
2015	Christopher Oram	Wolf Hall Parts One & Two	
2015	Paul Tazewell	Hamilton	
2015	Andrea Varga	The Fatal Weakness	

== Multiple wins ==
7 wins

- William Ivey Long

6 wins

- Theoni V. Aldredge

5 wins

- Florence Klotz

4 wins

- Patricia Zipprodt

2 wins

- Willa Kim
- John Napier
- Catherine Zuber
- Gregg Barnes
- Howard Crabtree
- Tim Hatley

== Multiple nominations ==
20 nominations

- William Ivey Long

10 nominations

- Theoni V. Aldredge

8 nominations

- Patricia Zipprodt
- Catherine Zuber
- Martin Pakledinaz

6 nominations

- Florence Klotz

5 nominations

- Jane Greenwood
- Jess Goldstein

4 nominations

- Willa Kim
- Ann Roth
- Ann Hould-Ward
- Santo Loquasto

3 nominations

- Bob Crowley
- Carrie Robbins
- John Napier
- Zack Brown
- Patricia McGourty
- Toni-Leslie James
- Julie Taymor

2 nominations

- Gregg Barnes
- Geoffrey Holder
- Franne Lee
- Albert Wolsky
- Rita Ryack
- Robert Morgan
- Joseph G. Aulisi
- Eiko Ishioka
- Howard Crabtree
- Bob Mackie
- Judith Dolan
- Roger Kirk
- Michael Krass
- Constance Hoffman
- Lez Brotherston
- Chris March
- Susan Hilferty
- Tim Hatley
- Mara Blumenfeld
- Michael Bottari
- Ronald Case
- Paloma Young
- Loren Shaw

== See also ==
- Laurence Olivier Award for Best Costume Design
- Tony Award for Best Costume Design
- Drama Desk Award for Outstanding Costume Design of a Musical
- Drama Desk Award for Outstanding Costume Design of a Play
