= 45th Tony Awards =

1991 US theatrical awards ceremony

- Official poster for the 45th annual Tony Awards
- Date: June 2, 1991
- Location: Minskoff Theatre, New York City, New York
- Hosted by: Julie Andrews; Jeremy Irons
- Most wins: The Will Rogers Follies (6)
- Most nominations: Miss Saigon and The Will Rogers Follies (11)

Television/radio coverage
- Network: CBS

The 45th Annual Tony Awards was broadcast by CBS from the Minskoff Theatre on June 2, 1991. The hosts were Julie Andrews and Jeremy Irons.

At these awards, Irons became the first celebrity to wear an AIDS awareness ribbon onscreen.

== Eligibility ==
Shows that opened on Broadway during the 1990–1991 season before May 2, 1991 are eligible.

Original plays

- I Hate Hamlet
- La Bête
- Lost in Yonkers
- Lucifer's Child
- Monster in a Box
- Our Country's Good
- Shadowlands
- Six Degrees of Separation
- The Speed of Darkness
- Stand-Up Tragedy
- Taking Steps

Original musicals

- Buddy: The Buddy Holly Story
- Bugs Bunny on Broadway
- Miss Saigon
- Once on This Island
- The Secret Garden
- Shōgun: The Musical
- Those Were the Days
- The Will Rogers Follies

Play revivals

- The Miser
- Mule Bone

Musical revivals

- Fiddler on the Roof
- Oh, Kay!
- Peter Pan

== The ceremony ==
Presenters: Carol Channing, Joan Collins, Tyne Daly, Whoopi Goldberg, Joel Grey, Steve Guttenberg, Audrey Hepburn, Raul Julia, Jackie Mason, Shirley MacLaine, James Naughton, Penn & Teller, Anthony Quinn, Lily Tomlin, Denzel Washington

Musicals represented:

- Miss Saigon ("The Heat is On in Saigon"/"Last Night of the World"/"I Still Believe"/"You Will Not Touch Him"/"The American Dream" - Lea Salonga, Jonathan Pryce. Company)
- Once on This Island ("The Human Heart"/"Mama Will Provide" - La Chanze, Lillias White, Company)
- The Secret Garden (Medley - Company)
- The Will Rogers Follies ("Will-A-Mania"/"Favorite Son" - Keith Carradine, Cady Huffman, Company)

Special Salute:

- How to Succeed in Business Without Really Trying ("The Year of the Musical Actor"/"I Believe in You" - Robert Morse)
- Fiddler on the Roof ("If I Were a Rich Man" - Topol)
- Bye Bye Birdie ("Rosie" - Tommy Tune and Ann Reinking [a live remote from Seattle])
- My Fair Lady and Camelot medley performed by Julie Andrews ("Wouldn't It Be Loverly" "Camelot" "I Could Have Danced All Night")
- The Phantom of the Opera ("Music of the Night" - Michael Crawford)

== Award winners and nominees ==
Winners are in bold

Best Play	Best Musical
**Lost in Yonkers – Neil Simon**; Our Country's Good – Timberlake Wertenbaker; Shadowlands – William Nicholson; Six Degrees of Separation – John Guare	**The Will Rogers Follies**; Miss Saigon; Once on This Island; The Secret Garden
Best Revival	Best Book of a Musical
**Fiddler on the Roof**; The Miser; Peter Pan	**Marsha Norman – The Secret Garden**; Alain Boublil and Claude-Michel Schönberg – Miss Saigon; Lynn Ahrens – Once on This Island; Peter Stone – The Will Rogers Follies
Best Performance by a Leading Actor in a Play	Best Performance by a Leading Actress in a Play
**Nigel Hawthorne – Shadowlands as C. S. Lewis**; Peter Frechette – Our Country's Good as 2nd Lieut. Ralph Clark; Tom McGowan – La Bête as Valere; Courtney B. Vance – Six Degrees of Separation as Paul	**Mercedes Ruehl – Lost in Yonkers as Bella Kurnitz**; Stockard Channing – Six Degrees of Separation as Ouisa Kittredge; Julie Harris – Lucifer's Child as Karen Blixen; Cherry Jones – Our Country's Good as Liz Morden/Reverend Johnson
Best Performance by a Leading Actor in a Musical	Best Performance by a Leading Actress in a Musical
**Jonathan Pryce – Miss Saigon as The Engineer**; Keith Carradine – The Will Rogers Follies as Will Rogers; Paul Hipp – Buddy: The Buddy Holly Story as Buddy Holly; Topol – Fiddler on the Roof as Tevye	**Lea Salonga – Miss Saigon as Kim**; June Angela – Shōgun: The Musical as Lady Mariko; Dee Hoty – The Will Rogers Follies as Betty Blake; Cathy Rigby – Peter Pan as Peter Pan
Best Performance by a Featured Actor in a Play	Best Performance by a Featured Actress in a Play
**Kevin Spacey – Lost in Yonkers as "Uncle" Louie**; Adam Arkin – I Hate Hamlet as Gary Peter Lefkowitz; Dylan Baker – La Bête as Prince County; Stephen Lang – The Speed of Darkness as Lou	**Irene Worth – Lost in Yonkers as Grandma Kurnitz**; Amelia Campbell – Our Country's Good as Various Characters; Kathryn Erbe – The Speed of Darkness as Mary; J. Smith-Cameron – Our Country's Good as 2nd Lieut. William Faddy
Best Performance by a Featured Actor in a Musical	Best Performance by a Featured Actress in a Musical
**Hinton Battle – Miss Saigon as John**; Bruce Adler – Those Were the Days as Various Characters; Gregg Burge – Oh, Kay! as Billy Lyes; Willy Falk – Miss Saigon as Chris	**Daisy Eagan – The Secret Garden as Mary Lennox**; Alison Fraser – The Secret Garden as Martha Sowerby; Cady Huffman – The Will Rogers Follies as Ziegfeld's Favorite; LaChanze – Once on This Island as Ti Moune
Best Original Score (Music and/or Lyrics) Written for the Theatre	Best Choreography
**The Will Rogers Follies – Cy Coleman (music) and Betty Comden and Adolph Green (lyrics)**; Miss Saigon – Claude-Michel Schönberg (music) and Richard Maltby, Jr. and Alain Boublil (lyrics); Once on This Island – Stephen Flaherty (music) and Lynn Ahrens (lyrics); The Secret Garden – Lucy Simon (music) and Marsha Norman (lyrics)	**Tommy Tune – The Will Rogers Follies**; Bob Avian – Miss Saigon; Graciela Daniele – Once on This Island; Dan Siretta – Oh, Kay!
Best Direction of a Play	Best Direction of a Musical
**Jerry Zaks – Six Degrees of Separation**; Richard Jones – La Bête; Mark Lamos – Our Country's Good; Gene Saks – Lost in Yonkers	**Tommy Tune – The Will Rogers Follies**; Graciela Daniele – Once on This Island; Nicholas Hytner – Miss Saigon; Eleanor Reissa – Those Were the Days
Best Scenic Design	Best Costume Design
**Heidi Landesman – The Secret Garden**; Richard Hudson – La Bête; John Napier – Miss Saigon; Tony Walton – The Will Rogers Follies	**Willa Kim – The Will Rogers Follies**; Theoni V. Aldredge – The Secret Garden; Judy Dearing – Once on This Island; Patricia Zipprodt – Shōgun: The Musical
Best Lighting Design
**Jules Fisher – The Will Rogers Follies**; David Hersey – Miss Saigon; Allen Lee Hughes – Once on This Island; Jennifer Tipton – La Bête

== Special Tony Awards ==
- Regional Theatre Award -- Yale Repertory Theater, New Haven, Connecticut
- Tony Honor—Father George Moore (Given Posthumously)

=== Multiple nominations and awards ===
These productions had multiple nominations:

- 11 nominations: Miss Saigon and The Will Rogers Follies
- 8 nominations: Once on This Island
- 7 nominations: The Secret Garden
- 6 nominations: Our Country's Good
- 5 nominations: La Bête and Lost in Yonkers
- 4 nominations: Six Degrees of Separation
- 2 nominations: Fiddler on the Roof, Oh, Kay!, Peter Pan, Shadowlands, Shōgun: The Musical, The Speed of Darkness and Those Were the Days

The following productions received multiple awards.

- 6 wins: The Will Rogers Follies
- 4 wins: Lost in Yonkers
- 3 wins: Miss Saigon and The Secret Garden

== See also ==
- Drama Desk Awards
- 1991 Laurence Olivier Awards – equivalent awards for West End theatre productions
- Obie Award
- New York Drama Critics' Circle
- Theatre World Award
- Lucille Lortel Awards
