= Albert Wolsky =

American costumer designer (1930–2026)

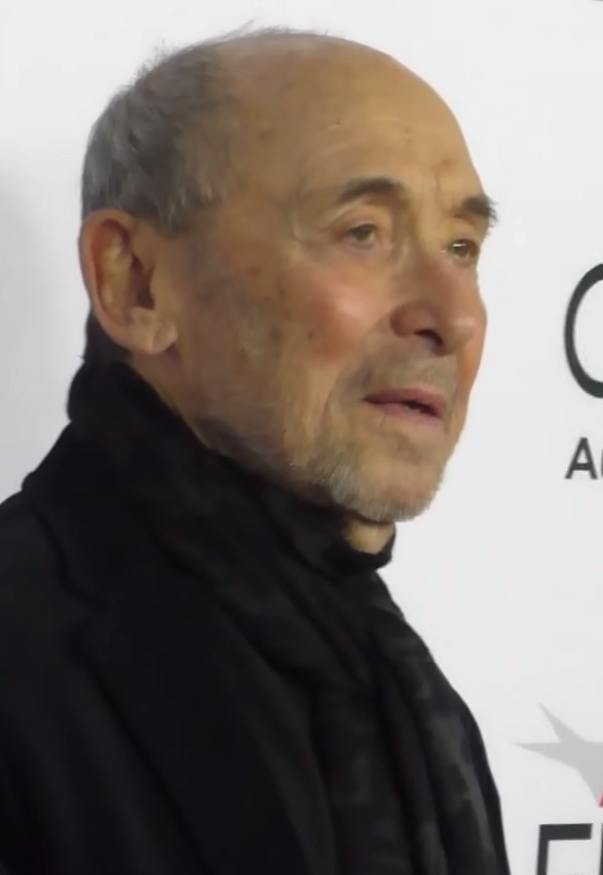
- Wolsky in 2016
- Born: November 24, 1930; Paris, France
- Died: May 23, 2026 (aged 95); Los Angeles, California, U.S.
- Occupation: Costume designer
- Years active: 1967–2022
- Partner: James Mitchell (died 2010)

Albert Wolsky (November 24, 1930 – May 23, 2026) was an American costume designer. He had worked both on stage shows as well as for film, and has been nominated for an Academy Award for Best Costume Design seven times, winning two awards for his work on the films All That Jazz (1979) and Bugsy (1991).

== Early life, military service and early career ==
Wolsky was born in Paris, France, on November 24, 1930, but during World War II, he and the rest of his family fled to the United States to escape the German occupation. After graduating from the City College of New York, he served in the army from 1953 to 1956, spending most of his enlistment in Japan. Once he returned to the United States, he began working in his father's travel agency. However, he decided to change careers and took an assistant's job with notable costume maker Helene Pons. His first show with Pons was Camelot. After a year and a half working together, they went separate ways. The two continued to be friends for years to come.

== Career ==
Wolsky became a costume designer, working both on Broadway and in the motion picture industry.

He began his career as costume designer for the theatre by assisting costume designer Ann Roth on A Case of Libel (1963); he later assisted Roth on The Odd Couple (1965), Patricia Zipprodt on Fiddler on the Roof (1964), and Theoni Aldredge on Illya Darling (1967). The first play Wolsky did on his own was Generation in 1965. He went on to serve as principal costume designer for both plays and musicals, including The Sunshine Boys (1972) and Sly Fox (1976). Wolsky was announced as the designer for the 2012 Broadway production of The Heiress.

The first film Wolsky worked on was The Heart Is a Lonely Hunter. He had been recommended to the film by Theoni Aldredge. Wolsky worked on many films including Harry and Tonto, The Turning Point, Grease and Manhattan. He worked with Bob Fosse, a leading Broadway director, on All That Jazz and won his first Academy Award. Wolsky went on to work with Fosse twice more. He won his second Academy Award for Bugsy in 1991 and has been nominated five other times, most recently for his work on Julie Taymor's Beatles-inspired musical Across the Universe (2007) and Sam Mendes's Revolutionary Road (2008).

In 2010, Wolsky donated his costume design sketches to the Margaret Herrick Library at the Academy of Motion Picture Arts and Sciences.

== Memberships ==
Wolsky was a member of the Board of Governors of the Academy of Motion Picture Arts and Sciences.

== Personal life and death ==
Wolsky's partner of 39 years was actor James Mitchell who died in 2010.

Wolsky lived in the Hollywood Hills and died at home on May 23, 2026, at the age of 95.

== Film credits ==
Year	Title	Director
1968	The Heart Is a Lonely Hunter	Robert Ellis Miller
1969	Popi	Arthur Hiller
1970	Loving	Irvin Kershner
1970	Lovers and Other Strangers	Cy Howard
1970	Where's Poppa?	Carl Reiner
1971	Little Murders	Alan Arkin
1971	Born to Win	Ivan Passer
1971	Lady Liberty	Mario Monicelli
1972	The Trial of the Catonsville Nine	Gordon Davidson
1972	Last of the Red Hot Lovers	Gene Saks
1972	Up the Sandbox	Irvin Kershner
1974	Harry and Tonto	Paul Mazursky
1974	The Gambler	Karel Reisz
1974	Lenny	Bob Fosse
1976	Next Stop, Greenwich Village	Paul Mazursky
1977	Thieves	John Berry
1977	The Turning Point	Herbert Ross
1978	Fingers	James Toback
1978	An Unmarried Woman	Paul Mazursky
1978	Grease	Randal Kleiser
1978	Moment by Moment	Jane Wagner
1979	Manhattan	Woody Allen
1979	Meteor	Ronald Neame
1979	All That Jazz	Bob Fosse
1980	Willie & Phil	Paul Mazursky
1980	The Jazz Singer	Richard Fleischer
1981	Paternity	David Steinberg
1982	Tempest	Paul Mazursky
1982	Still of the Night	Robert Benton
1982	Sophie's Choice	Alan J. Pakula
1983	Star 80	Bob Fosse
1983	To Be or Not to Be	Alan Johnson
1984	Moscow on the Hudson	Paul Mazursky
1985	The Falcon and the Snowman	John Schlesinger
1985	The Journey of Natty Gann	Jeremy Kagan
1986	Down and Out in Beverly Hills	Paul Mazursky
1986	Legal Eagles	Ivan Reitman
1986	Crimes of the Heart	Bruce Beresford
1987	Nadine	Robert Benton
1988	Moon over Parador	Paul Mazursky
1989	Chances Are	Emile Ardolino
1989	Cookie	Susan Seidelman
1989	She-Devil	Susan Seidelman
1989	Enemies, A Love Story	Paul Mazursky
1990	Funny About Love	Leonard Nimoy
1991	Scenes from a Mall	Paul Mazursky
1991	Bugsy	Barry Levinson
1992	Toys	Barry Levinson
1993	The Pickle	Paul Mazursky
1993	Fatal Instinct	Carl Reiner
1993	The Pelican Brief	Alan J. Pakula
1994	Junior	Ivan Reitman
1995	The Grass Harp	Charles Matthau
1996	Up Close and Personal	Jon Avnet
1996	Striptease	Andrew Bergman
1997	Red Corner	Jon Avnet
1997	The Jackal	Michael Caton-Jones
1998	You've Got Mail	Nora Ephron
1999	Runaway Bride	Garry Marshall
1999	Galaxy Quest	Dean Parisot
2000	Lucky Numbers	Nora Ephron
2002	Road to Perdition	Sam Mendes
2002	Maid in Manhattan	Wayne Wang
2004	The Manchurian Candidate	Jonathan Demme
2005	Jarhead	Sam Mendes
2006	Ask the Dust	Robert Towne
2007	Across the Universe	Julie Taymor
2007	Charlie Wilson's War	Mike Nichols
2008	Revolutionary Road	Sam Mendes
2009	Duplicity	Tony Gilroy
2011	Larry Crowne	Tom Hanks
2014	Birdman	Alejandro González Iñárritu
2016	Rules Don't Apply	Warren Beatty
2019	Ad Astra	James Gray
2021	The Woman in the Window	Joe Wright
2022	Amsterdam	David O. Russell

== Honors and awards ==
- Academy Awards
  - Winner: All That Jazz, 1980; Bugsy, 1992
  - Nominee: Sophie's Choice, 1983; The Journey of Natty Gann, 1986; Toys, 1993; Across the Universe, 2008; Revolutionary Road, 2009
- Hollywood Film Award, Costume Designer of the Year, 2004
- Costume Designers Guild, Career Achievement Award, 1999
- TDF/Irene Sharaff Lifetime Achievement Award, 2010
- Antoinette Perry Award
  - 2013 Best Costume Design of a Play for The Heiress (nominee)
- Drama Desk Award
  - 1976 Outstanding Costume Design for They Knew What They Wanted (nominee)
  - 1976 Outstanding Costume Design for A Memory of Two Mondays / 27 Wagons Full of Cotton (nominee)
  - 1977 Outstanding Costume Design for Sly Fox (nominee)

== Bibliography ==
- Chaneles, Sol & Wolsky, Albert (1974) The Movie Makers: the lives and films of more than 2,500 stars, supporting actors, and directors who have made motion picture history. Secaucus, NJ: Derbibooks
