= The Torch-Bearers =

1922 play

- Original language: English
- Written by: George Kelly
- Genre: Comedy

Premiere
- Date: 1922

The Torch-Bearers is a 1922 stage play by George Kelly about a housewife who becomes an actress (the original actress became a widow and withdrew) while her husband is away on business, with Act I being the rehearsal at their home, Act II is the show, and Act III is afterwards. The play is in the style of, as is the play within the play, of the Little Theatre Movement.

== Production history ==
=== Original production ===
It premiered originally in New Jersey at the Savoy Theatre in Asbury Park, directed by Kelly. The original cast was:

- Arthur Shaw as Frederick Ritter
- Douglas Garden as Huxley Hossefrosse
- Edward Reese as Mr. Spindler
- Booth Howard as Ralph Twiller
- William Castle as Teddy Spearing
- J. A. Curtis as Stage Manager
- Mary Boland as Paula Ritter
- Alison Skipworth as J. Duro Pampinelli
- Helen Lowell as Nelly Fell
- Rose Mary King as Florence McCrickett
- Daisy Atherton as Clara Sheppard
- Mary Gildea as Jenny

The show transferred to Broadway and opened on August 29, 1922 at the 48th Street Theatre before moving to the Vanderbilt Theatre.

=== 2000 revival ===
The show was revived in 2000 at the Greenwich House, directed by Dylan Baker, with set design by Michael Vaughn Sims, costume design by Jonathan Bixby and Gregory Gale, lighting by Mark Stanley, sound by Robert Murphy, hair design by Darlene Dannenfelser, production supervision by Entolo, production stage management by John Handy, and assistant stage management by Casey Bozeman.

- David Garrison as Frederick Ritter
- Faith Prince as Paula Ritter
- Marian Seldes as J. Duro Pampinelli
- Judith Blazer as Florence McCrickett
- Joan Copeland as Nelly Fell
- Paul Mullins as Ralph Twiller
- Don Mayo as Huxley Hossefrosse
- Ralph Cole Jr. as Teddy Sperling
- Susan Mansur as Jenny
- Claire Beckman as Clara Sheppard
- Albert Macklin as Mr. Spindler

=== 2009 revival ===
It was revived again in 2009 at the Williamstown Theatre Festival, also directed by Dylan Baker, with set design by David Korins, lighting by Rui Rita, costume design by Ilona Somogyi, sound design by Alex Neumann, and original music by Michael Garin.

- John Rubinstein as Fred Ritter
- Becky Ann Baker as Paula Ritter
- Jessica Hecht as Clara Sheppard
- Katherine McGrath as Duro Pampinelli
- Katie Finneran as Florence McCrickett
- Andrea Martin as Nelly Fell
- Edward Herrmann as Huxley Hossefrosse
- Philip Goodwin as Ralph Twiler
- Yusef Bulos as Mr. Spindler
- James Waterston as Teddy Spearing
- Lizbeth MacKay as Jenny
- John Doherty as Stage Manager

== Screen adaptations ==
In 1935, William Conselman and Bartlett Cormack adapted The Torch-Bearers into Doubting Thomas starring Will Rogers, Billie Burke, and Alison Skipworth. A 1939 movie, Too Busy to Work, starred Jed Prouty, Spring Byington, and Kenneth Howell.
