= James Greene (American actor) =

American actor (1926–2018)

- Born: James Thomas Nolan; December 1, 1926; Lawrence, Massachusetts, U.S.
- Died: November 9, 2018 (aged 91); Los Angeles, California, U.S.
- Occupation: Actor
- Years active: 1950–2018
- Spouse(s): Betty Miller (m. 19??; div. 19??); Elsbeth M. Collins (m. 1984)

James Greene, born James Thomas Nolan, (December 1, 1926 – November 9, 2018) was an American film, theater and television character actor. Greene was best known to television audiences for his recurring role as Councilman Fielding Milton, the oldest member of the fictional Pawnee city council on Parks and Recreation, as well as his starring role as Davey McQuinn the elevator operator on The Days and Nights of Molly Dodd, which aired for five seasons on NBC and Lifetime from 1987 to 1991. He also had a recurring role as Uncle Moodri in the Fox Network science fiction TV series Alien Nation.

== Early life ==
Greene was born James Nolan in Lawrence, Massachusetts, on December 1, 1926, to Tim and Martha Nolan. He graduated from Emerson College in Boston in 1950. Greene then became an original, founding member of Elia Kazan's Lincoln Center Repertory Company in New York City.

== Career ==
In 1951, Greene made his Broadway debut in Romeo and Juliet, starring Olivia de Havilland, as a chorus member. He appeared in 22 Broadway plays and productions between 1951 and 1991, as well as 29 off-Broadway plays. His Broadway credits included the original Broadway debut productions of Inherit the Wind in 1955; The Changeling, also helmed by Elia Kazan, in 1964; and Foxfire, opposite Jessica Tandy and Hume Cronyn, in 1982. He also appeared in the Broadway revivals of You Can't Take It With You in both the 1965 and 1967 productions, as well as The Iceman Cometh in 1985, in which he co-starred with Jason Robards. His last Broadway appearance was in David Hirson's play La Bête in 1991.

His screen career spanned nearly 60 years, from a background role in the 1960 television movie John Brown's Raid (based on the historical incident), to his final appearance in a February 2018 episode of the web series Break a Hip. His appearances included starring as Davey McQuinn the elevator operator on The Days and Nights of Molly Dodd (1987–1991), and a recurring role as Councilman Fielding Milton on Parks and Recreation (2012–2015).

== Personal life ==
In the 1960s, Green was married to actress Betty Miller. At the time of his death, he had been married to Elsbeth M. Collins for 34 years.

== Death ==
Greene died on November 9, 2018, in Los Angeles, California, at the age of 91.

== Filmography ==
Year	Title	Role
1961	Mad Dog Coll	Ernie
1964	Babo 73	Lawrence Silver-Sky
1970	The Traveling Executioner	Gravey Combs
1971	Doc	Frank McLowery
1975	Bug	Reverend Kern
1976	The Missouri Breaks	Hellsgate Rancher
1981	Ghost Story	Mailman
1982	A Little Sex	Father Anthony
1982	Hanky Panky	Doorman
1984	Body Rock	Chilly's Friend #2
1993	Nowhere to Run	Country Store Clerk
1993	Philadelphia Experiment II	Professor Longstreet
1997	Photographing Fairies	Minister
1998	Patch Adams	Bile
2001	Instinct to Kill	Old Man
2002	Road to Perdition	Farmer Bill
2003	The Statement	Dom Olivier
