= Ann Hould-Ward =

American costume designer (born 1954)

- Born: April 8, 1954 (age 72); Glasgow, Montana, U.S.
- Education: University of Virginia
- Known for: Costume designer
- Awards: Tony Award for Best Costume Design

Ann Hould-Ward (born April 8, 1954, in Glasgow, Montana) is an American costume designer, primarily for the theatre and dance. She has designed the costumes for 24 Broadway productions (as of February 2021). She won the 1994 Tony Award for Beauty and the Beast.

== Biography ==
Ann Hould-Ward attended Mills College (B.A.), the University of Virginia (M.F.A.), and the Art Students League. After writing to Patricia Zipprodt asking for a job, she was introduced by her to Rouben Ter-Arutunian and became his assistant. She later was Zipprodt's assistant.

Her first Broadway costume designs were for the musical Sunday in the Park with George (1984), in collaboration with Patricia Zipprodt, for which they received a joint Tony Award nomination. She designed the costumes for the Broadway musical A Catered Affair (2008), for which she received the 2008 Drama Desk Award nomination for Outstanding Costume Design. Her costumes for Beauty and the Beast (tour) were called "luscious, from peasant garb in the early scenes to elegant formal wear in the finale and the ornate costumes of the half-human candlesticks, clocks and teapots that share the Beast's spell." In reviewing Stephen Sondheim's Road Show, the theatermania.com reviewer noted: "Still, the ensemble members definitely look smart in the outfits Ann Hould-Ward has designed to conjure the blueprints Addison ran up for his fabled Palm Beach homes." Her costume designs for the revival of Sondheim's Company were called " dark, sleek costumes" by the USA Today reviewer.

She has designed costumes for many regional theater companies. At the La Jolla Playhouse (California) she designed the costumes for Going To St. Ives in 2000. Her costume designs for Red, Hot and Blue were used in productions at the Goodspeed Opera House, East Haddam, Connecticut in 2000 and the Paper Mill Playhouse, Millburn, New Jersey in 2001. According to John Kenrick her "costumes hit all the right notes". Her work at The Old Globe Theatre, San Diego, California, includes The Countess in 2001. She designed costumes for several productions at the Arena Stage, Washington, DC, including Three Sisters (1984), Sondheim's Merrily We Roll Along (1990) and Let Me Down Easy (2010).

Her Off-Broadway work includes, at Playwrights Horizons Lobster Alice (2000), at the Public Theater Road Show (2008), and at Second Stage Theatre Let Me Down Easy, by Anna Deavere Smith (2009). Her costumes for The Public Theater Shakespeare in the Park outdoor staging of A Midsummer Night’s Dream in 2007 were said to be "stunning, audaciously conceived Victorian costumes. Enos looks scrumptious enough to eat in her pink and white bustled dress that might easily pass muster as a wedding cake." She designed the costumes for the US National tour of Dr. Dolittle (2005); Hould-Ward stated that she "drew inspiration from the horse's mouth, so to speak; she found original copies of the Hugh Lofting books that were simply illustrated by the author himself."

Hould-Ward has designed costumes for dance and ballet, including the Ballet Hispanico, Lar Lubovitch's The White Oak Project, and the American Ballet Theatre. She also designs for the opera. She designed the costumes for the Los Angeles Opera production of Rise and Fall of the City of Mahagonny (2007), starring Audra McDonald and Patti LuPone.

She designed costumes for Ringling Bros. and Barnum & Bailey Circus in 2001. Her career reached stratospheric heights during 2014 when she was entrusted with redesigning the outfit of America's favourite hamburger clown, Ronald McDonald. She described this as a "highlight" of her career, and few would argue this statement. Her inspired creation centred around a natty red jacket, a matching bow tie & cargo pants.

== Stage credits ==
Year	Title	Role	Venue	Ref.
1984	Sunday in the Park with George	Costume designer	Broadway, Booth Theatre	
1985	Harrigan 'n Hart	Costume designer	Broadway, Longacre Theatre	
1987	Into the Woods	Costume designer	Broadway, Martin Beck Theatre	
1992	Falsettos	Costume designer	Broadway, John Golden Theatre	
1993	Saint Joan	Costume designer	Broadway, Lyceum Theatre	
1993	Three Men on a Horse	Costume designer	Broadway, Lyceum Theatre	
1993	In the Summer House	Costume designer	Broadway, Vivian Beaumont Theatre	
1993	Timon of Athens	Costume designer	Broadway, Lyceum Theatre	
1994	Beauty and the Beast	Costume designer	Broadway, Palace Theatre	
1995	The Molière Comedies	Costume designer	Broadway, Criterion Center Stage Right	
1995	On the Waterfront	Costume designer	Broadway, Brooks Atkinson Theatre	
1997	Dream	Costume designer	Broadway, Royale Theatre	
1998	More to Love	Costume designer	Broadway, Eugene O'Neill Theatre	
1998	Little Me	Costume designer	Broadway, Criterion Center Stage Right	
2002	Dance of the Vampires	Costume designer	Broadway, Minskoff Theatre	
2006	Company	Costume designer	Broadway, Ethel Barrymore Theatre	
2008	Road Show	Costume designer	Off-Broadway, The Public Theater	
2008	A Catered Affair	Costume designer	Broadway, Walter Kerr Theatre	
2010	The Grand Manner	Costume designer	Off-Broadway, Lincoln Center Theatre	
2010	A Free Man of Color	Costume designer	Broadway, Vivian Beaumont Theatre	
2011	The People in the Picture	Costume designer	Broadway, Studio 54	
2015	The Visit	Costume designer	Broadway, Lyceum Theatre	
2015	The Color Purple	Costume designer	Broadway, Bernard B. Jacobs Theatre	

=== Ballet, Dance and Opera ===
American Ballet Theatre

- Othello (1997), Meadow (1999), The Pied Piper (2001) and Artemis (2003)

Ballet Hispanico

- Stages (1990), Guahira (1999)

Opera

- Metropolitan Opera - Peter Grimes (Britten) (2008)
- New York City Opera – The Most Happy Fella (Loesser)
- Los Angeles Opera – Rise and Fall of the City of Mahagonny (2007) (Weill)
- Florida Grand Opera – Regina (Blitzstein) (2002)
- Seattle Opera – Amelia (2010)

== Awards and nominations ==
Award	Year	Category	Work	Result	Ref.
1984	Tony Awards	Best Costume Design	Sunday in the Park with George	Nominated	
1984	Drama Desk Awards	Outstanding Costume Design	Sunday in the Park with George	Nominated	
1988	Tony Awards	Best Costume Design	Into the Woods	Nominated	
1988	Drama Desk Awards	Outstanding Costume Design	Into the Woods	Nominated	
1994	Tony Awards	Best Costume Design	Beauty and the Beast	Won	
2008	Drama Desk Awards	Outstanding Costume Design	A Catered Affair	Nominated	
2011	Drama Desk Awards	Outstanding Costume Design	A Free Man of Color	Nominated	
2024	TDF/Irene Sharraf Awards	Sustained Excellence in Costume Design		Won	

== Sources ==
- Pecktal, Lynn. Costume Design (1999). Back Stage Books, ISBN 0-8230-8812-X, pp. 98–109
