= Young-Oak Kim =

American military officer (1919–2005)

- Kim in 1961
- Born: January 29, 1919; Los Angeles County, California, U.S.
- Died: December 29, 2005 (aged 86); Los Angeles County, California, U.S.
- Burial place: National Memorial Cemetery of the Pacific
- Military career
- Allegiance: United States
- Branch: United States Army
- Service years: 1941–1946; 1950–1972
- Rank: Colonel
- Commands: 1st Battalion, 31st Infantry Regiment
- Conflicts: World War II; Korean War
- Awards: Distinguished Service Cross; Silver Star (2); Legion of Merit (2); Bronze Star (2); Purple Heart (3); Bronze Medal of Military Valor (Italy); Légion d'honneur Croix de Guerre; Taeguk Cordon of the Order of Military Merit (Korea)

Korean name
- Hangul: 김영옥
- RR: Gim Yeongok
- MR: Kim Yŏngok

Young-Oak Kim (Korean: 김영옥; 1919 – December 29, 2005) was a United States Army officer during World War II and the Korean War as well as a civic leader and humanitarian. He was a member of the U.S. 100th Infantry Battalion and 442nd Regimental Combat Team, and a combat leader in Italy and France during World War II. He was awarded 19 medals, including the Distinguished Service Cross, two Silver Stars, two Bronze Stars, three Purple Hearts, a Bronze Medal of Military Valor, a Légion d'honneur, a Croix de Guerre, and (posthumously) the Korean Taeguk Cordon of the Order of Military Merit. After his military career, Kim dedicated his life to public service and was an active founder and leader of several non-profit organizations for underserved communities throughout Southern California. He died of cancer at the age of 86. In May 2016, members of the Congressional Asian Pacific American Caucus held a press conference, organized by the Council of Korean Americans, to call on President Barack Obama to posthumously award Kim the nation's highest civilian honor, the Presidential Medal of Freedom.

== Early life and education ==
Kim was born in Los Angeles in 1919. His parents were Soon Kwon Kim and Nora Koh. He had three brothers, two sisters, and one adopted brother, Andy Kil. One of his sisters was two-time Tony Award-winning costume designer Willa Kim. His father was a member of Daehanin-dongjihwe (대한인 동지회, literally: "The Great Korean People's Association"), the group Syngman Rhee established in Hawaii to help liberate Korea from Japan. This background helped Kim build a strong cultural identity. He grew up in Bunker Hill, Los Angeles, California, where his parents operated a grocery store at the intersection of Temple Street and Figueroa Street. Throughout Kim’s childhood, his family struggled financially due to his father's addiction to gambling.

Kim graduated from Belmont High School and proceeded to Los Angeles City College. He dropped out after a year to support his family. He tried various jobs, but racial discrimination prevented him from staying long at any job.

The U.S. Army refused his enlistment for the same reason. But after the U.S. Congress enacted a law subjecting Asian Americans to conscription, Kim was drafted into the Army. He entered service on January 31, 1941, three months before his father died.

== Career ==
=== World War II ===
After spending half a year in the Army as an engineer, Kim was selected for the Infantry Officer Candidate School at Fort Benning, Georgia. Upon graduating in January 1943, he was assigned to the U.S. 100th Infantry Battalion, a unit of Japanese Americans from Hawaii. The battalion commander offered him a transfer, fearing ethnic conflict between Young Oak and the Japanese-American troops. (At the time, Korea was occupied by the Japanese empire.) Regardless, he insisted on staying, stating that "there [are] no Japanese nor Korean here. We're all Americans and we're fighting for the same cause."

The 100th Battalion was sent to North Africa to assist in the war in Europe, but initially the U.S. Army had no plan for its deployment due to racial discrimination at the time. By its own request, the battalion was sent to the front and joined the war in Italy. There, Kim's map-reading skills and determination led to success in many battles and some "impossible missions".

Second Lieutenant Young Oak Kim's first deployment was in Salerno, Italy, as part of the Allied offensive against the German forces in Italy. In this first offensive, he was wounded near Santa Maria Olivetto and was subsequently awarded his first Silver Star and Purple Heart. Young Oak Kim was then promoted to first lieutenant and participated in the Battle of Monte Cassino as part of the U.S. attempt to liberate Rome from German control. In the planning for Operation Diadem, the Allies needed to determine the locations of German tank units. Lieutenant Kim, as an officer in the joint U.S. 100th Infantry Battalion and 442nd Regimental Combat Team, volunteered to capture German soldiers to gain military intelligence. On May 16, 1944, with Private First Class Irving Akahoshi, he crawled into German territory near Cisterna, Italy. They captured two German soldiers in the daytime while the enemy rested for the evening watch. The information they gathered from the prisoners helped determine that there was not a tank unit in the breakthrough path the Allies were considering. The Allies broke the Gustav Line, and liberated Rome. For his actions, Lieutenant Kim was awarded the U.S. Distinguished Service Cross and the Italian Bronze Medal of Military Valor in 1944 and the Italian War Cross for Military Valor in 1945.

He also led elements of the 100th Battalion in battles at Belvedere and Pisa, which helped break the Gothic Line. The Allies were able to occupy Pisa without casualties.

In France, Kim was the battalion's operations officer. He fought in battles that liberated the towns of Bruyères and Biffontaine. He sustained severe wounds from enemy fire in Biffontaine, and later spent a six-month leave in Los Angeles in late 1944. Germany surrendered shortly before he was to return to the European Theater of Operations, and Captain Kim was consequently honorably discharged from the U.S. Army. For his actions, Captain Kim received a second Purple Heart and a French Croix De Guerre, along with a plaque dedicated to him on the Biffontaine church wall.

=== Korean War ===
Kim left the Army after World War II. However, there were not many opportunities for a young Korean man. He started a self-service laundry, which was quite rare at the time. The business was very successful; Kim's earnings were five times his salary as an Army captain. Two years later, war broke out in Korea in 1950. Kim abandoned the business and re-entered the Army:

As a Korean, the most direct way to help my father's country even a little, and as a U.S. citizen, the most direct way to repay even a little the debt owed to Korea by the U.S. was to go to Korea, pick up a gun and fight.

— Young-Oak Kim, interview, The Chosun Ilbo

The Army allowed all U.S. soldiers of Korean descent—and anyone who could speak at least a word of Korean—to work in the Army Security Agency. Kim was no exception, but he wanted to fight. At his request, he was sent to East Asia, and by pretending not to know any Korean and with the help of people he had known from World War II, he was able to join the infantry. This was the first time he had ever been to Korea.

He was assigned to the 31st Infantry of the 7th Infantry Division in April 1951 as the intelligence officer, under Lieutenant General William J. McCaffrey, who scouted him. Kim worked not only as an intelligence officer, but also virtually as an operations officer at the request of McCaffrey. Kim rescued many U.S. and South Korean army troops in several battles.

The 31st Infantry played a major role in stopping Chinese troops and pushing them back above the 38th parallel. Kim's unit was the very first to cross that line. The 7th Infantry Division redrew the situation map every day, but only recorded the locations of regiments or larger military units. However, the map from May 31, 1951, included the location of Kim's battalion.

During Operation Piledriver in August, after a battle in which his unit proceeded to the north of Kimhwa, his unit was mistakenly bombarded by the 555th Field Artillery Battalion because it seemed too far north to be friendly. Kim was seriously injured in the friendly fire incident. He was saved by doctors from Johns Hopkins University, who were in Tokyo. He made it back to Korea after two months of recuperation.

Upon his return, McCaffrey put him in command of the regiment's 1st Battalion and promoted him to the rank of major. Major Kim became the first minority officer to command an Army battalion on the battlefield in U.S. history. His battalion also adopted an orphanage in Seoul. More than 500 war orphans were taken care of, and grew up to become artists, musicians, and other successful professionals. After fighting for nearly a year, Young Oak Kim left Korea in September 1952. In 2003, the government of the Republic of Korea decorated Kim for his social service.

After serving in the Korean War, Major Kim became an instructor at the U.S. Army Infantry School in Fort Benning, Georgia. He then served in Germany as a staff officer and was promoted to lieutenant colonel in 1959, and also became an instructor at the U.S. Army Command and General Staff College. Kim returned to Korea in the early 1960s as a U.S. military advisor to the South Korean army, during which he was promoted to the rank of colonel.

== Awards and decorations ==
Badges

Combat Infantryman Badge (2nd Award)

Decorations

Distinguished Service Cross
Silver Star with bronze oak leaf cluster
Legion of Merit with bronze oak leaf cluster
Bronze Star with "V" Device and bronze oak leaf cluster
Purple Heart with two bronze oak leaf clusters
Army Commendation Medal

Unit Award

Army Presidential Unit Citation with silver and bronze oak leaf clusters

Service Medals

American Defense Service Medal
American Campaign Medal
European-African-Middle Eastern Campaign Medal with four bronze campaign stars
World War II Victory Medal
Army of Occupation Medal
National Defense Service Medal with service star
Korean Service Medal with three bronze campaign stars
Armed Forces Expeditionary Medal

Foreign Awards

Bronze Medal of Military Valor (Italy)
French Legion of Honour (Officer)
French Croix de guerre
Taeguk Cordon of the Order of Military Merit (South Korea)
Republic of Korea Presidential Unit Citation
United Nations Korea Medal
Republic of Korea War Service Medal

== Later life and death ==
After serving in the Army for 30 years, Kim retired with 80% disability in 1972. He attended California State University Dominguez Hills to study history, but left after a year because he wanted to focus his energy on a greater cause. Kim felt that it was time for him to use his leadership skills to serve his community in Los Angeles. He decided to begin a new chapter of his life as an advocate for racial equality, youth, the elderly, and the poor.

In 1973, he joined Special Services for Groups (SSG), a non-profit health and human service organization dedicated to building and sustaining community-based programs that address the needs of vulnerable, richly diverse multi-ethnic communities. George Nishinaka, the head of SSG at the time, helped Kim become more involved with community service by nominating him to be a board member of United Way. Kim was the first Asian American person to serve on the United Way board for a total of 10 years. He recognized the underserved ethnic communities in Los Angeles and worked to provide them with linguistically and culturally competent services. When Kim joined the board, the Chinatown Service Center was the only United Way Asian Center. Kim added the Japanese, Filipino, Vietnamese, and Korean American Centers to United Way. He also diversified the board with three more Asian American members.

Kim continued to be an active member of the Asian American community and beyond. In 1975, he helped found the Korean Youth and Cultural Center, now known as the Koreatown Youth and Community Center. The organization now serves more than 11,000 immigrants from Asia and Latin America each year. It helps youth and families in Los Angeles who are struggling with poverty and language barriers. Kim further served the Korean American community, as a founding member of the Korean American Coalition (KAC) from 1985 to 2005. The KAC has an ongoing goal to promote civic and civil rights interests of the Korean American community, through education, community organization, leadership development, and coalition-building with diverse communities.

From 1986 to 1988, Kim served as a member of Serving the Family & Friends of the Keiro Homes, part of a non-for-profit healthcare organization that promotes healthy lifestyles for the elderly. Throughout the 1990s he served as Chairman of the Center for Pacific Asian Families, an organization that was founded to help address violence and sexual assault in the Asian and Pacific Islander communities. Under his leadership, the Center for Pacific Asian Families became the largest women’s shelter in Southern California.

In 1986, Kim co-founded the Korean Health, Education, Information, and Research Center to provide new, uninformed immigrants with the health care information and services that they are entitled to receive by law in America. As one of the largest ethnic charity organizations today, it continues to help new immigrants obtain basic health care and offers them bilingual services in English, Spanish, and Korean.

Along with health care and equal opportunities for the poor, Kim also valued education. From 1989 until 2005, he served as Chairman of 100th/442nd/MIS Memorial Foundation, a veteran’s association of Japanese American soldiers who fought during World War II. Under his leadership, the organization worked directly with teachers and provided them with lesson plans to tell students the story of these Army units and cultivate a sentiment of national pride and respect in schools throughout the United States. [28] Kim also co-founded other organizations that continue to educate the public: the Go For Broke Monument, the Go For Broke Educational Foundation, and the Japanese American National Museum.

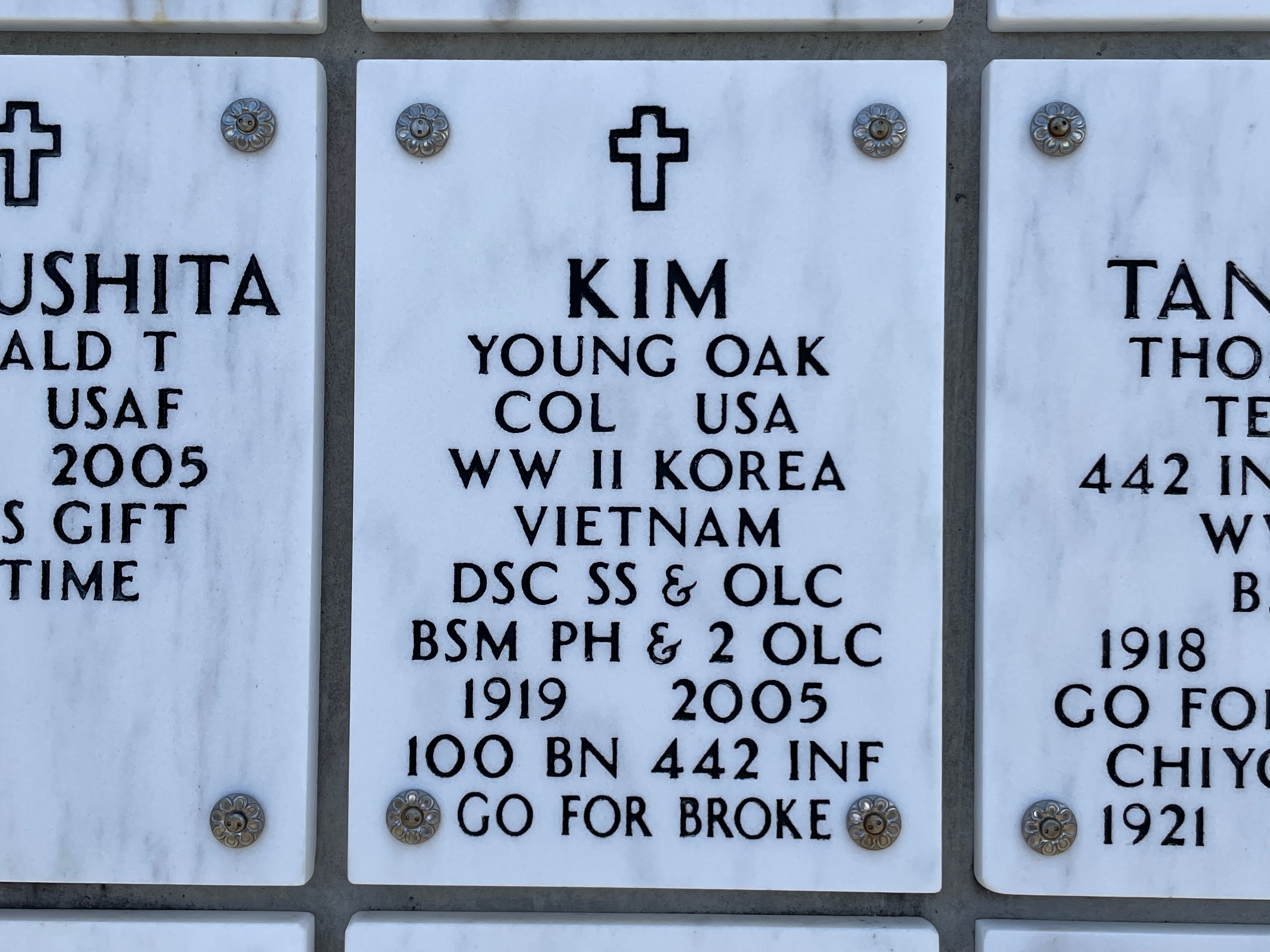
Young-Oak Kim's grave at Punchbowl National Cemetery

Kim died from cancer on December 29, 2005, at Cedars-Sinai Medical Center in Los Angeles and rests at the National Memorial Cemetery of the Pacific (Punchbowl) in Honolulu, Hawaii. He has three stepsons, one sister, and two brothers. His sister Willa Kim was a well known American costume designer.

== Legacy ==
A newly opened middle school in Los Angeles' fourth local district was named Young Oak Kim Academy in 2009 in recognition of Kim. In 2010, the Young Oak Kim Center for Korean American Studies opened at the University of California, Riverside. The Young Oak Kim Center has published many books discussing the history of the Korean American community, and has dedicated a biography to Young Oak Kim's life in the military after his military service. The book is called "Unsung Hero: the Col. Young O. Kim Story," and was originally written in Korean by Woo Sung Han and was translated to English by Professor Edward T. Chang.

In 2016, the Council of Korean Americans (CKA), a national, non-partisan, non-profit organization of Korean American leaders, spearheaded coordination of diverse civic, political, and military leaders from across the United States to nominate Kim for a 2016 Presidential Medal of Freedom. The nomination was formally announced on May 17, 2016, at a press conference in Washington, DC by members of the Congressional Asian Pacific American Caucus and is part of a series of tributes CKA plans leading up to what would be Kim's 100th Birthday on January 29, 2019.

== See also ==
- U.S. 100th Infantry Battalion
- 442nd Regimental Combat Team
- U.S. 31st Infantry Regiment
- Operation Shingle
- Go For Broke!—This film dramatizes the lives and wartime heroics of the 442nd Regimental Combat Team and the 100th Infantry Battalion's Hawaiian troops. The film stars Van Johnson as a young officer, reluctant about his assignment to the 442nd. He comes to respect the Nisei troops, eventually contesting a transfer back to his original Texas unit.
- Willa Kim—Young-Oak Kim's sister, a noted costume designer for stage, dance and film who twice received the Tony Award for Outstanding Costume Design.
