= Martin Pakledinaz =

American costume designer

- Born: Martin Pakledinaz; September 1, 1953; Sterling Heights, Michigan
- Died: July 8, 2012; Manhattan, New York
- Known for: Costume designer
- Awards: Tony Awards; Drama Desk Award for Outstanding Costume Design

Martin Pakledinaz (September 1, 1953 – July 8, 2012) was an American costume designer for stage and film.

He won his Tony Awards for designing the costumes for Thoroughly Modern Millie and the 2000 revival of Kiss Me, Kate, which also earned him the Drama Desk Award for Outstanding Costume Design.

His most recent costume designs were for the Broadway shows Nice Work If You Can Get It (2012); Man and Boy (revival, 2011); Master Class (revival 2011) and The Normal Heart. He worked on the 1995 production of Holiday at the Circle in the Square Theatre.

He designed costumes for plays for the leading regional theatres of the United States, and the Royal Dramatic Theatre of Sweden. Opera credits include works at the New York Metropolitan Opera (Lucia di Lammermoor, Rodelinda, Iphigénie en Tauride) and the New York City Opera, as well as opera houses in Seattle, Los Angeles, St. Louis, Santa Fe, Houston, and Toronto. European houses include Salzburg, Paris, Amsterdam, Brussels, Helsinki, Gothenburg, and others.

He also designed for dance companies such as the San Francisco Ballet production of Nutcracker, and worked with Mark Morris for many years.

Pakledinaz died from brain cancer on July 8, 2012, at the age of 58.

Shortly after his death, he was posthumously inducted into the American Theater Hall of Fame.

== Education ==
Pakledinaz received a BFA from Wayne State University and an MFA (1975) from the University of Michigan.
