= Douglas Carter Beane =

American playwright and screenwriter

- Born: July 12, 1959 (age 67); Wilkes-Barre, Pennsylvania, U.S.
- Notable work: Sister Act (2011 musical); Xanadu (2007 musical); The Little Dog Laughed (2006 play); The Country Club (1999 play); To Wong Foo, Thanks for Everything! Julie Newmar (1995 film)

Douglas Carter Beane (born July 12, 1959) is an American playwright and screenwriter. He has been nominated for five Tony Awards and won two Drama Desk Awards. His plays are essentially works with sophisticated, "drawing room" humor but just as often farce, particularly his work in musical theater.

His works include the screenplay of To Wong Foo, Thanks for Everything! Julie Newmar, and several plays including The Country Club and The Little Dog Laughed, which was nominated for the 2007 Tony Award for Best Play and As Bees in Honey Drown, which ran at New York's Lucille Lortel Theatre in 1997.

== Early life ==
Beane was born July 12, 1959, in Wilkes-Barre, Pennsylvania to Paul LeRoy Beane and Joan Delores (Carter) Beane. He was raised in Wyomissing, Pennsylvania.

Beane trained as an actor, graduating from the American Academy of Dramatic Arts New York campus in 1980. He is very involved with his alma mater, workshopping new pieces with the students.

Beane is the artistic director of the Drama Department Theater Company in New York.

== Career ==
Beane wrote the book for Xanadu, a stage musical adaptation of the 1980 film of the same name, adding new plot twists and humor parodying the original movie. The musical was workshopped in 2006 and early 2007 with director Christopher Ashley and actors Jane Krakowski, Tony Roberts, and Cheyenne Jackson. The musical opened on Broadway at the Helen Hayes Theatre on July 10, 2007. Kerry Butler and Cheyenne Jackson were the Broadway leads. Beane won the Drama Desk Award for Outstanding Book of a Musical and was nominated for the Tony Award for Best Book of a Musical.

In 2011, Beane was hired to "doctor" the book for the musical Sister Act alongside Bill and Cheri Steinkellner for which he was nominated for a Tony Award, Best Book of a Musical.

Beane wrote the book for the musical Lysistrata Jones and rewrote the book for a new adaptation of Rodgers and Hammerstein's Cinderella which opened on Broadway in 2013.

Also opening in 2013 was his new play for Lincoln Center, The Nance, starring Nathan Lane and directed by Jack O'Brien. The play was a change of pace, essentially a drama set in the 1930s starring Lane as Chauncey Miles, a fading vaudeville comic specializing in nance characters, effeminate, mocking parodies of homosexual men. Miles is in fact gay and filled with self-hate and bitterness yet gets a chance at true love for the first time late in his life. Most reviews were favorable although much of the praise was directed at Lane's performance. The play was filmed by PBS and aired on Live from Lincoln Center. The following year Beane revised the libretto for the Metropolitan Opera's new production of the operetta Die Fledermaus which was performed in 2013- 2014.

Beane's play The Closet premiered in 2018 at the Williamstown Theatre Festival for a limited two-week run starting June 30. The play starred Matthew Broderick as a widely disliked heterosexual nerd working at a religious supplies company who suddenly becomes interesting and popular when his co-workers and family presume he is having an affair with his new roommate, a flamboyant homosexual (played by Brooks Ashmanskas). The farce received generally good reviews and was compared to Norman, Is That You?.

A stage musical based on his screenplay for "To Wong Foo, Thanks for Everything, Julie Newmar" premiered in 2023 at the Hope Mill Theatre. Beane and his husband, Lewis Flinn, collaborated on the project for several years before its premiere.

Beane directed the revue Finding Dorothy Parker in September 2025, a play he "edited and compiled" from Dorothy Parker's writings. It will be performed at the Laurie Beechman Theatre with actresses Julie Halston, Ann Harada, Jackie Hoffman, and Anika Larsen.

== Personal life ==
Beane is married to his frequent collaborator, composer Lewis Flinn, and the two are parents to two adopted children, Cooper and Gabrielle.

== Awards and nominations ==
- 2013 Broadway.com Audience Choice Awards - Favorite New Play - The Nance
- 2013 Outer Critics Circle Awards - Outstanding New Broadway Play - The Nance
- 2013 Tony Awards - Best Book of a Musical - Rodgers + Hammerstein's Cinderella
- 2012 Drama Desk Awards - Outstanding Book of a Musical - Lysistrata Jones
- 2012 Tony Awards - Best Book of a Musical - Lysistrata Jones
- 2011 Tony Awards - Best Book of a Musical - Sister Act
- 2008 Tony Awards - 2008 - Best Book of a Musical - Xanadu
- 2007 Drama Desk Award - Outstanding Book of a Musical - Xanadu - won
- 2007 Tony Awards - Best Play - The Little Dog Laughed
- 1999 Drama Desk Awards - Outstanding Play - As Bees in Honey Drown - won
- 1998 Outer Critics Circle Awards - John Gassner Playwriting Award - As Bees in Honey Drown - won
- 1997 Drama Desk Awards - Outstanding Orchestrations - As Bees in Honey Drown

== Selected works ==
=== Broadway ===
- 2013 The Nance
- 2013 Rodgers and Hammerstein's Cinderella
- 2011 Lysistrata Jones
- 2011 Sister Act
- 2007 Xanadu
- 2006 The Little Dog Laughed

=== Off-Broadway ===
- 2021 Fairycakes
- 2019 The Big Time - Book by Beane, Music and Lyrics by Douglas J. Cohen
- 2015 Shows for Days
- 2010 Mr. & Mrs. Fitch
- 2006 The Little Dog Laughed
- 2001 Music from a Sparkling Planet
- 1999 The Country Club
- 1997 As Bees In Honey Drown
- 1996 Advice From a Caterpillar

=== Film ===
- 1995 To Wong Foo, Thanks for Everything! Julie Newmar
