= Civic Theatre of Allentown =

Cinema in Allentown, Pennsylvania, US

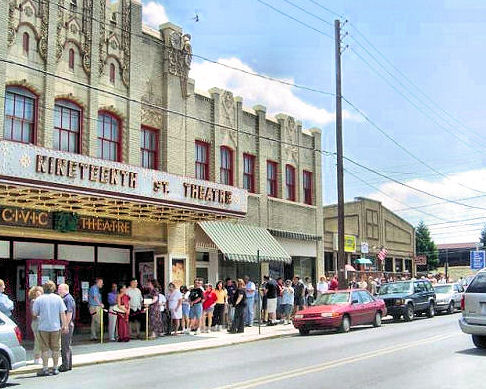
- Civic Theatre of Allentown in May 2004
- Interactive map of Civic Theatre of Allentown
- Address: 527 North 19th Street; Allentown, Pennsylvania, U.S. 18104
- Coordinates: 40°36′12″N 075°29′59″W
- Current use: Stage productions, Education programs, Film presentations

Construction
- Opened: 1928
- Years active: 1928, 1930-1952, 1953-Present

Website
- Official website

The Civic Theatre of Allentown, also known as the Nineteenth Street Theatre, is the oldest cinema in Allentown, Pennsylvania. The theater opened on September 17, 1928. It hosts live theater, educational programs, and screens art house films. In July 1957, the property was purchased by Allentown's Civic Little Theatre. Since then, stage productions have been performed at the theater. In 1994 the company officially changed its name to the Civic Theatre of Allentown. Its building on 19th Street was listed on the National Register of Historic Places in 2024.

The Civic Theatre produces a live theatre season including four mainstage productions. It also produces children's theatre productions and special events. The theater's film arm primarily shows a variety of independent and international films, generally at lower prices than first run cinemas, with about 60 to 80 movie titles a year. The Theater School enrolls more than 350 students a year in Fall, Winter and Summer sessions. The theater's annual operating budget is roughly $1 million per year.

== History ==
=== Origins ===
In the early 1920s, a building boom began in the West End of Allentown. Residents wanted houses with yards and more open space with less noise than in Allentown's busy center city. Within four years, more than 150 homes with yards were built in that area. In addition to the homes, plans were made for a block of shops, offices and restaurants. The Civic Theater was an important part of this plan.

The theater, located at 527 North 19th Street in Allentown, was developed by Rubin Mainker and Alex Minker and opened on September 17, 1928. "No expense has been spared. The walls inside were painted green with gold and silver accents. The outside of the building was bright yellow with fanciful decorations of birds, flowers, butterflies and elephants," The Allentown Morning Call reported.

The first movie to be shown at the Civic Theatre was a silent film called The Sawdust Paradise. It featured the new Moller DeLuxe theater organ that the owners had purchased for $16,000. The heirloom instrument is still played at times for audiences at the theater today, though the large opening crowds were not able to make the theater a success. Financial problems and the evolution away from silent films made it difficult for the owners to keep it open. In December 1928 the cinema closed its doors.

=== Second-run cinema ===
In 1930, the theater was sold to an L.J. Chamberlain of Amusements Inc. It was converted to show sound films, and it became a second-run theater which, unlike its contemporaries in downtown Allentown, played popular films in a residential neighborhood after they ended their first run at the larger theaters in the entertainment district. Prices were considerably less: during the Depression of the 1930s, admission was 20 cents for adults and 10 cents for children. It operated successfully through the 1930s and 1940s. However, after World War II and the advent of television, attendance at the theater dropped, and it closed in February 1952.

In May 1953, however, Americus Hotel owner Albert Moffa reopened the Nineteenth Street Theater in May 1953. It was purchased from Amusements, Inc, for $90,000, and the theater's projection system was modified to show 3D films, a fad at the time. The first film shown was the 1953 musical Down Among the Sheltering Palms.

=== Civic Theatre ===
During the mid-1950s, Harold Heydt, then manager of the movie theatre began showing foreign films. In July 1957, Allentown's Civic Little Theatre announced it had purchased the 19th Street Theatre from Moffa for $95,000. It was the first home the community theatre group had had since its founding in the late 1920s. The nonprofit volunteer group began to enlarge the stage and quickly bowed to community requests in late 1957 that the Moller organ be retained.

Since taking ownership, and after many changes, the Civic Theatre of Allentown offers several plays a year at the theatre, in addition to a variety of independent and international films. Civic Theater School provides theatre training for young people of ages 4–18. The theatre's board of directors voted to hire William Sanders as artistic director in 1991 and he has led the theatre to produce A Christmas Carol annually.

In 1994, significant renovations were made to the marquee, which was in severe need of updating. Fundraising efforts and a grant from the Trexler Trust was secured to finance the repair, which was carried out by the Alvin Butz Inc. construction company.

In addition to its main historic theater, Civic Theater of Allentown owns Theatre514, a production center and a 92-seat theatre that is directly across the street from the main theater. Civic uses the facility as one of its screens for its well-regarded independent and international film series, as well as to produce and present additional theatrical programming. This theatre underwent a major renovation and expansion in summer 2014.

Lehigh Valley-area alumni who have appeared at the Civic Theatre of Allentown include Michaela Conlin (Fox's Bones), Dane DeHaan (In Treatment), Michael McDonald (Broadway revival of Hair), Daniel Roebuck (The Late Shift), actress Amanda Seyfried (Mama Mia), and actress Christine Taylor (The Wedding Singer).

=== Current status ===
Civic Theatre entered the digital motion picture era when it replaced its traditional 35mm projectors with state-of-the art DCI compliant units. The conversion was completed in August 2013. Civic Theatre's live production arm has produced adaptations of Charles Dickens' A Christmas Carol. The production is being marked with special events, including a retrospective exhibition at Allentown's Liberty Bell Museum. Civic's recent production of Young Frankenstein was its best attended musical in recent years. Its production of Breakfast at Tiffany's was the first post-Broadway production of the play since its New York City close in 2013.

The Civic Theatre began a two-phase renovation project that will restore the auditorium, upgrade the stage equipment and improve the backstage and front-of-house amenities. The project is led by Mills and Schnoering Architects with Stages Consultants providing theatre and acoustics consulting.

== See also ==
- List of historic places in Allentown, Pennsylvania
