= Gordon Stanley (actor) =

American stage actor (born 1951)

- Born: December 20, 1951 (age 69); Boston, Massachusetts, United States
- Education: Brown University
- Occupations: Actor, singer, musician
- Years active: 1969–present

Gordon Stanley (born December 20, 1951, Boston, Massachusetts, United States) is an American stage actor.

== Theatre career ==
His first professional stage appearance came in a production of Richard III at the Court Theatre in Chicago in 1969. His Off-Broadway debut came in 1977 in Lyrical and Satirical. His Broadway debut was in 1980 in the musical Onward Victoria.

Stanley has performed in numerous Broadway shows, including Ragtime, Joseph and the Amazing Technicolor Dreamcoat, Beauty and the Beast, and Cabaret.

== Personal life ==
Stanley married Renee Lutz, a stage manager on May 18, 1980.

== Filmography ==
Stanley has sung in the animated musical films Beauty and the Beast, Pocahontas, The Hunchback of Notre Dame, and Aladdin and the King of Thieves.

== Stage credits ==
=== Broadway ===
- Onward Victoria (1980) -- as Fleming
- Joseph and the Amazing Technicolor Dreamcoat (1982) -- as Jacob
- Into the Light (1986) -- as Signor Bocciarelli
- Teddy & Alice (1987) -- as Elihu Root
- Meet Me in St. Louis (1989) -- as Dr. Bond/Ensemble
- Beauty and the Beast (1994) -- as Bookseller/Monsieur D'Arque/Townsperson/Enchanted Object
- Ragtime (1998) -- as Reporter/Trolley Conductor/Charles S. Whitman/Ensemble
- Cabaret (1998) -- as Herr Schultz (replacement)

=== Off-Broadway ===
- Joseph and the Amazing Technicolor Dreamcoat (1981) -- as Jacob
- Diamonds (1984) -- as Men
- Moby Dick (1986) -- as Peleg/ Captain of Rachel
- Who Does She Think She Is? (1987)
- All's Well That Ends Well (2006) -- as Reynaldo/Street Singer
- Take Me Along (2008) -- as Dave McComber
- Flamingo Court (2009) -- N/A
- White Woman Street (2010) -- as Mo Mason
- Lies My Father Told Me (2013) -- as Mr. Baumgarten / Proprietor

=== Regional and national tours ===
- Under Milk Wood (1970) -- as First Voice (Court Theatre)
- A Midsummer Night's Dream (opera) (1976) -- as Puck (Curtis Opera Theatre)
- Annie (1978) -- Harold Ickes (National Tour)
- Allegro (1978) --as Charlie (Equity Library Theatre)
- Carousel (1980) -- as Mr. Snow (Coachlight Theatre)
- Fiddler on the Roof (1981) -- as Motel (Artpark Theatre)
- A Little Night Music (1981) -- as Mr. Erlanson (York Theatre)
- The Desert Song (1981) -- as Sid el Kar (Light Opera of Manhattan)
- Two on the Isles (1981) -- as Rodney (Actors' Holiday)
- My Fair Lady (1983) -- as Freddy (Theatre of the Stars)
- Sullivan and Gilbert (1984) -- as Courtice Pounds (Stage Arts Theatre Company)
- Elizabeth and Essex (1984) -- as Cecil (York Theatre)
- Red, Hot and Blue (1984) -- Fingers (Equity Library Theatre)
- Lightin' Out (1992) -- (Judith Anderson Theatre)
- Funny Girl (2003) -- as Keeney/Mr. Rinaldi (Barrington Stage Company)
- Show Boat (2008) -- as Cap'n Andy (North Shore Music Theatre)
- The Crucible (2010) -- as Giles Corey(Barrington Stage Company)
- 1776 (2013) -- as Stephen Hopkins (Pittsburgh Public Theater)
- Much Ado About Nothing (2013) -- (Barrington Stage Company)
