= Carrie Robbins =

American costume designer (1943–2024)

Carolyn Mae Robbins (née Fishbein; February 7, 1943 – April 12, 2024) was an American costume designer.

She designed the poodle skirts for the stage production of Grease. She won her first Drama Desk Award for Outstanding Costume Design for her work on the original Broadway production of Over Here! and the 1973 revival of The Iceman Cometh in 1974, and was nominated for the Tony Award for Best Costume Design in 1972 and 1974.

Robbins was born in Baltimore, the daughter of a public school teacher and a former seamstress. She studied art and drama at Pennsylvania State University, where she earned a bachelor’s degree in 1964, and she received a Master of Fine Arts degree from the Yale School of Drama in 1967. She was married to Dr. Richard D. Robbins, a surgeon, from 1969 until his death from pancreatic cancer in 2003; they had no children. She died on April 12, 2024, at the age of 81, from COVID-19. Her health had declined after a fall in December 2023, which resulted in a broken hip.
