= Michael McDonald (costume designer) =

American costume designer (1963–2024)

- Born: October 15, 1963; Allentown, Pennsylvania, U.S.
- Died: September 4, 2024 (aged 60)
- Education: Muhlenberg College
- Known for: Costume designer

Michael McDonald (October 15, 1963 – September 4, 2024) was an American costume designer who was nominated for both a Tony Award and a Drama Desk Award in 2009 for his work on the Broadway revival of the musical Hair.

== Early life and education ==
McDonald was born in Allentown, Pennsylvania, on October 15, 1963. He was a 1981 graduate of William Allen High School. He attended Muhlenberg College in Allentown, where he took his first costume design course and subsequently worked on several of Muhlenberg's theatrical productions.

== Career ==
In 1984, McDonald became involved in theatre at the Civic Theatre of Allentown.

In the early 1990s, he relocated to New York City, where he worked on productions including The Ride Down Mt. Morgan (Broadway, 2000), The Goat, or Who is Sylvia? (Broadway, 2002), and Take Me Out (Broadway, 2003). In 2009, his work on the Broadway revival of Hair earned him nominations for both the Tony Award for Best Costume Design and the Drama Desk Award for Outstanding Costume Design.

== Death ==
McDonald died after a brief illness on September 4, 2024, at the age of 61.
