= Willa Kim =

American costume designer (1917–2016)

- Born: Wullah Mei Ok Kim; June 30, 1917; Orange County, California, U.S.
- Died: December 23, 2016 (aged 99); Vashon Island, Washington, U.S.
- Education: Chouinard Art Institute
- Known for: Costume designer
- Spouse: William Pène du Bois (m. 1955; died 1993)

Wullah Mei Ok Kim (Korean:김월라; Hanja:金月羅; June 30, 1917 – December 23, 2016), known as Willa Kim, was an American costume designer for stage, dance, and film.

== Life and career ==
Kim was born near Santa Ana, California in 1917 and graduated Belmont High School in 1935 where she was an art editor for the 1935 Campanile (Belmont's yearbook). The end sheets of the yearbook are free hand drawings of her impressions of high school life atop Crown Hill (the site of Belmont High School).

For her post-secondary education, she attended Chouinard Art Institute (now the California Institute of the Arts) on a scholarship. Upon graduation, she worked for designer Raoul Pene du Bois in the film industry but soon started designing for the theatre.

Kim designed costumes for Broadway shows, winning Tony Awards for her costume designs for The Will Rogers Follies and Sophisticated Ladies. She received an additional four Tony Award nominations and won the Drama Desk Award for Outstanding Costume Design twice.

Kim designed costumes for the American Ballet Theatre as well as other dance companies, including more than 50 works for Eliot Feld. Furthermore, in 2007 Kim was inducted into the American Theater Hall of Fame, making her one of only a handful of costume designers so honored. Her other Broadway credits include Bosoms and Neglect.

In 2003 Kim received the 'Patricia Zipprodt Award for Innovative Costume Design' from the Fashion Institute of Technology. In 2005 she received the Distinguished Achievement Award for Costume Design from the United States Institute for Theatre Technology.

Kim died on December 23, 2016, at the age of 99.

== Family ==
In 1955, Kim married children's book illustrator and Paris Review co-founder William Pene du Bois. Kim's brother, Colonel Young Oak Kim, was a highly decorated U.S. Army combat veteran of World War II and the Korean War; he was honored on October 6, 2009, in a special ceremony at the Young Oak Kim Academy, named in his honor.

== Bibliography ==
- The Designs of Willa Kim (2005) by Bobbi Owen (ISBN 1933348003)
