= The Country Club (play) =

The Country Club is an off-Broadway play written by Douglas Carter Beane.

== Plot ==
Soos, a young, witty, charming neurotic, retreats to her upper-class hometown in the aftermath of a failed marriage. The type of WASP domain with houses “that made Martha Stewart forget she was Polish.” As party after party unfolds, the getaway weekend gives way to a year, and ultimately the rest of her life.

Brittle conversation is bandied about, and Soos is reunited with her onetime boyfriend, the charming Zip (Played by Jared Kressman). She also returns to her circles of old friends: the highly strung party planner Froggy and her starchy husband Bri; the wry and sarcastic Pooker; the alcoholic good ol' boy Hutch. But cracks soon begin to show in the facade. Soos falls in and out of an easy relationship with Zip, as he starts an affair with Chloe, a working-class Roman Catholic girl from Philadelphia (who is also engaged to Hutch).

Lives are casually destroyed, lives careen onward, and through it all tragedies are endured without ever being mentioned. As Pooker observes between cocktail sips, "We all have our little stories and nobody brings them up. That's what's known as community spirit."

== Productions ==
The play was presented Off-Broadway by the Drama Dept. at the Greenwich House Theater, running from September 14, 1999 to December 18, 1999. The production received 2000 Drama Desk Award nominations for Outstanding Costume Design and Outstanding Featured Actress in a Play (Sedaris).

The play had "small productions" at the Dorset Theater Festival (Vermont) and Mojo Ensemble (Los Angeles) prior to the production at the Long Wharf Theatre. The play premiered at the Long Wharf Theatre, New Haven, Connecticut in January 1998.

=== Crew ===
| Douglas Carter Beane | writer |
| Christopher Ashley | director |
| James M. Youmans | sets |
| Frances Aronson | lighting |
| Laura Grace Brown | sound |
| Jonathan Bixby | costumes * |
| Gregory Gale | costumes * |
| John Handy. | Production Stage Manager |
| Casey Dean Bozeman | Assistant Stage Manager |

=== Cast (Off-Broadway) ===
| Cynthia Nixon | Soos |
| Amy Hohn | Pooker |
| Amy Sedaris | Froggy * |
| Peter Benson | Bri |
| Tom Everett Scott | Zip |
| Frederick Weller | Hutch |
| Callie Thorne | Chloe |

* 45th Annual Drama Desk Awards nomination (2000)

== Sources ==
- 45th Annual Drama Desk Awards, 2000
