= Kathryn Erbe =

American actress (born 1965)

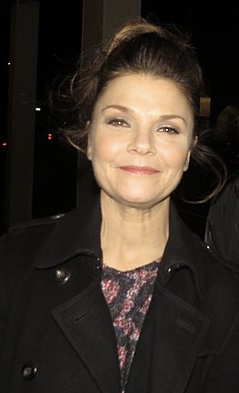
- Erbe in 2016
- Born: Kathryn Elsbeth Erbe; July 5, 1965 (age 61); Newton, Massachusetts, U.S.
- Education: New York University
- Occupation: Actress
- Years active: 1989–present
- Spouse: Terry Kinney (m. 1993; div. 2006)
- Children: 2

Kathryn Elsbeth Erbe (born July 5, 1965) is an American actress. She is best known for her role as Alexandra Eames on Law & Order: Criminal Intent, a spin-off of Law & Order, and Shirley Bellinger in the HBO series Oz.

== Early life ==
Erbe was born in Newton, Massachusetts, the daughter of Elsbeth and Richard Erbe. She graduated from New York University (NYU) in 1989.

== Career ==
While an undergraduate student at NYU, Erbe was cast as the daughter of Lynn Redgrave's character on the sitcom Chicken Soup. She later became a member of Steppenwolf Theatre Company and has starred in many of their productions, including A Streetcar Named Desire, Curse of the Starving Class, and The Grapes of Wrath, which ran for six months and won the 1990 Tony Award for Best Play. Erbe earned a Tony Award nomination in 1991 for her portrayal of Mary in The Speed of Darkness.

Erbe starred in such films as What About Bob?, Stir of Echoes, Rich in Love, and the independent films Dream with the Fishes, Love from Ground Zero, and Entropy. She played opposite David Caruso in Kiss of Death. She portrayed Shirley Bellinger on the HBO series Oz. She made a guest appearance on Homicide: Life on the Street in 1997. From 2001 to early 2010, she starred as Detective Alexandra Eames on the NBC/USA Network series Law & Order: Criminal Intent, alongside Vincent D'Onofrio.

In 2010, both Erbe and D'Onofrio left Criminal Intent. Erbe signed on to reprise the role of Detective Eames for the eight-episode final season of the series, joining Vincent D'Onofrio, who had already signed up to return as Detective Robert Goren. She has reprised the role in guest appearances on Law & Order: Special Victims Unit. In 2014, Erbe appeared in an episode of Last Week Tonight parodying her role on Law & Order: Criminal Intent. She also played Fay Ambrose, the wife of Detective Harry Ambrose, in the USA Network's The Sinner.

== Personal life ==
Erbe was married to actor Terry Kinney (who also starred in Oz) from 1993 until their divorce in 2006. Together, they have two children.

== Filmography ==
=== Film ===
Year	Title	Role	Notes
1989	Runaway Dreams	Denise Donaldson	
1991	What About Bob?	Anna Marvin	
1993	Rich in Love	Lucille Odom	
1994	D2: The Mighty Ducks	Michele MacKay	
1994	Breathing Lessons	Fiona	Television film
1995	The Addiction	Anthropology Student	
1995	Kiss of Death	Rosie D'Amico-Kilmartin	
1997	Dream with the Fishes	Liz	
1997	George Wallace	Mrs. Folsom	Television film
1998	Love from Ground Zero	Alex	
1998	Naked City: Justice with a Bullet	Sarah Tubbs	Television film
1999	Entropy	Evan	
1999	Stir of Echoes	Maggie Witzky	
2000	The Runaway	Evelyn Carnes	Television film
2001	Speaking of Sex	Helen	
2010	3 Backyards	John's Wife	
2011	Mother's House	Catherine	Short film
2011	The Love Guide	Cora	
2014	Worst Friends	Sam's Mom	
2015	Mistress America	Stevie Fishko	
2017	Dating My Mother	Joan	
2018	Alex Strangelove	Helen	
2018	Assassination Nation	Rebecca Colson	
2021	The Good House	Wendy Heatherton	
2024	Don't Pick Up	Louisa Bodek	Short Film
2025	Death of a Unicorn	Tapestry Video Narrator (voice)	

=== Television ===
Year	Title	Role	Notes
1989	Chicken Soup	Patricia Reece	12 episodes
1997	Homicide: Life on the Street	Rita Hale	Episode: "All Is Bright"
1998–2003	Oz	Shirley Bellinger	17 episodes
2001–2011	Law & Order: Criminal Intent	Det. Alexandra Eames	142 episodes Nominated—Satellite Award for Best Actress – Television Series Drama
2012–2013	Law & Order: Special Victims Unit	Lt. Alexandra Eames	2 episodes
2014	Last Week Tonight with John Oliver	Alexandra Eames	Episode: "Civil Forfeiture"
2015	Blue Bloods	Sharon Bennett	Episode: "Unsung Heroes"
2016	Elementary	Nancy Davenport	Episode: "Miss Taken"
2016	Conviction	Carla Macy	Episode: "Bad Deals"
2016	American Experience	Lucretia Garfield	Episode: "Murder of a President"
2017–2018	How to Get Away with Murder	Jacqueline Roa	4 episodes: "Lahey v. Commonwealth of Pennsylvania", "Live. Live. Live.", "Nobody Roots for Goliath", "Stay Strong, Mama" (Season 4)
2017	The Sinner	Fay Ambrose	5 episodes
2018	Pose	Dr. Gottfried	2 episodes
2018	The Gifted	Aunt Dane	Episode: "the dreaM"
2019	Instinct	Caitlyn Gerich	Episode: "Big Splash"
2019–2022	City on a Hill	Sue Stanton	7 episodes
2020	The Good Fight	Zoe Redgrave	Season 4 Episode: "The Gang Deals With Alternate Reality"
2021	The Blacklist	Lois	2 episodes

== Theatre ==
Year	Title	Role	Notes
1990	The Grapes of Wrath	Aggie Wainwright	
1991	The Speed of Darkness	Mary	Nominated—Tony Award for Best Featured Actress in a Play
1995	A Month in the Country	Verochka	
2012	Checkers	Pat	Vineyard Theater
2015	Afghanistan, Zimbabwe, America, Kuwait	Mom	Gym at Judson
2016	The Father	Anne	Broadway: Samuel J. Friedman Theatre
2024	Ashes & Ink	Molly	AMT Theater
