= Young Oak Kim Academy =

School in Los Angeles, California

Coordinates: 34.063191°N 118.290145°W

Information
- Established: September 9, 2009; 16 years ago
- School district: Los Angeles Unified School District
- NCES District ID: 0622710
- Principal: Edward Colacion
- Grades: 6-8
- Gender: Boys and girls taught separately
- Capacity: 810
- Mascot: Dragon

Young Oak Kim Academy (YOKA) is a middle school within the Los Angeles Unified School District (LAUSD), Local District 4. It was established in 2009 as the only middle school in the LAUSD to practice single-sex education. The school is named in honor of Colonel Young-Oak Kim, a veteran of the segregated 442nd Regimental Combat Team in World War II, and during the Korean War, became the first Asian-American officer to lead a U.S. battalion in combat. It is L.A.'s first middle school, and the third school overall, named for a Korean American. The building was designed by the architectural firm Arquitectonica adjacent to its Wilshire Vermont Station mixed use transit village development.

== Overview ==
YOKA is a public middle school serving the communities of Pico Union and Koreatown, at 615 S. Shatto Place near the corner of Wilshire Boulevard and Vermont Avenue. It is part of a multi-use site that includes an apartment building, retail space, and eating establishments. The school was designed to alleviate overcrowding at Berendo and Virgil middle schools. It opened on September 9, 2009, with an enrollment capacity of 810 students in grades 6 through 8. YOKA's principal is Edward Colacion. The school's mascot is the dragon.

The school is devoted to instructing boys and girls in a single-gender environment for core subjects. YOKA also focuses on STEM fields (science, technology, engineering, and mathematics) education as a core component of their curriculum in all content. Accordingly, the school has a STEM Lab and a STEM Library on campus. Students enhance their skills and knowledge in these areas, leading to greater college and career opportunities. Teachers incorporate interdisciplinary units and project-based learning (PBL) into their instruction to support STEM single-gender education.
