= The Speed of Darkness (play) =

1989 play written by Steve Tesich

- Original language: English
- Written by: Steve Tesich
- Characters: Joe; Lou (Joe's friend); Anne (Joe's wife); Mary (Joe's daughter); Eddie (Mary's friend)
- Subject: Vietnam veterans
- Genre: Drama
- Setting: South Dakota

Premiere
- Date: April 24, 1989
- Place: Goodman Theatre, Chicago

The Speed of Darkness is a 1989 play written by Steve Tesich. The play is about two Vietnam War veterans who meet again after eighteen years. One man, Joe. is a success, while the other, Lou, is a failure. A long hidden secret threatens to destroy both men.

The play opened in Chicago at the Goodman Theatre in 1989 and debuted on Broadway in 1991 at the Belasco Theatre. The 1991 production received two Tony Award nominations for best actor and actress in a play,

== Plot summary ==
Joe is a successful businessman and a popular member of his community. He is a Vietnam War veteran. A hero to his neighbors. A construction contractor who has achieved phenomenal commercial success after the war. He is a family man. He has been named South Dakota's Man of the Year.

Everything is going perfectly until he meets a fellow Vietnam War vet, Lou. Lou, by contrast, is a total failure, a homeless man who has been shattered by the war. During this unexpected encounter, Lou reveals secrets that threaten to undermine Joe's perfect world. Joe discovers that his daughter is not his own. But what brings their world crashing down is the long-held secret that Lou reveals on how Joe began his rise to success.

Joe's fortune was based on a crime. Both Joe and Lou were complicit. They had illegally dumped barrels of toxic waste on the bluffs overlooking the area. The toxins polluted and poisoned the water supply in the region. Lou commits suicide. Joe must come to terms with their illegal act.

== Productions ==
The play received its world premiere in 1989 at the Goodman Theatre in Chicago, with Bill Raymond as Joe, Stephen Lang as Lou, and Lee Guthrie as Anne.

It made its Broadway premiere two years later at the Belasco Theatre on February 28, 1991, where it ran for 36 performances. Stephen Lang reprised his role as Lou, appearing along with Len Cariou as Joe, Lisa Eichhorn as Joe's wife Anne, Kathryn Erbe as Joe's daughter Mary, and Robert Sean Leonard as Mary's friend Eddie. Both Lang and Erbe received Tony Award nominations as Best Featured Actor and Actress (respectively) in a Play.

== Sources ==
- Bommer, Lawrence. Review: The Speed of Darkness. May 4, 1989. Chicago Reader.
- DeRose, David J. "The Speed of Darkness and 'Crazed Vets on the Doorstep' Drama." Theater Studies, Yale University. Viet Nam Generation Journal & Newsletter, V3, N3 (November 1991).
- Kocheer, Chris. "‘Speed of Darkness’ Struggles with Legacy of Vietnam War." September 26, 2017. Binghamton Press & Sun-Bulletin. New York. PressConnects.
- Rich, Frank. Review: The Speed of Darkness. May 9, 1989. The New York Times.
- Rich, Frank. 1991 Broadway Review. The Speed of Darkness. March 1, 1991. The New York Times.
