= A Free Man of Color =

Play written by John Guare, premiered 2010

- Original language: English
- Written by: John Guare
- Genre: Drama
- Setting: New Orleans

Premiere
- Date: November 18, 2010
- Place: Vivian Beaumont Theater; New York City

A Free Man of Color is a play written by John Guare. The play is set in New Orleans in 1801 as the United States is attempting to purchase Louisiana from France, as well as some scenes taking place in Haiti and France. The story follows main character Jacques Cornet, "a new world Don Juan" and the wealthiest colored man in New Orleans. Cornet gains all of his money from his father who is a wealthy plantation owner. With extreme wealth comes much responsibility for which Cornet is not quite ready. Cornet spends his time searching for maps of the New World and sleeping with women all over the city who find Cornet's money very attractive. During the time of the play New Orleans lacked any true law and order and the city is a parade of young men and women. Guare directs the play through the actions of Cornet as he is able to meet with characters Thomas Jefferson and Napoleon Bonaparte throughout the play. By showing these confrontations the reader is able to learn about significant historical data such as the Yellow Fever, Napoleonic tactics, and the slave rebellion that nearly took over Santo Domingo's government. Cornet deals with a significant amount of adversity as the city goes through rapid expansion. His world changes as racism enters the city.

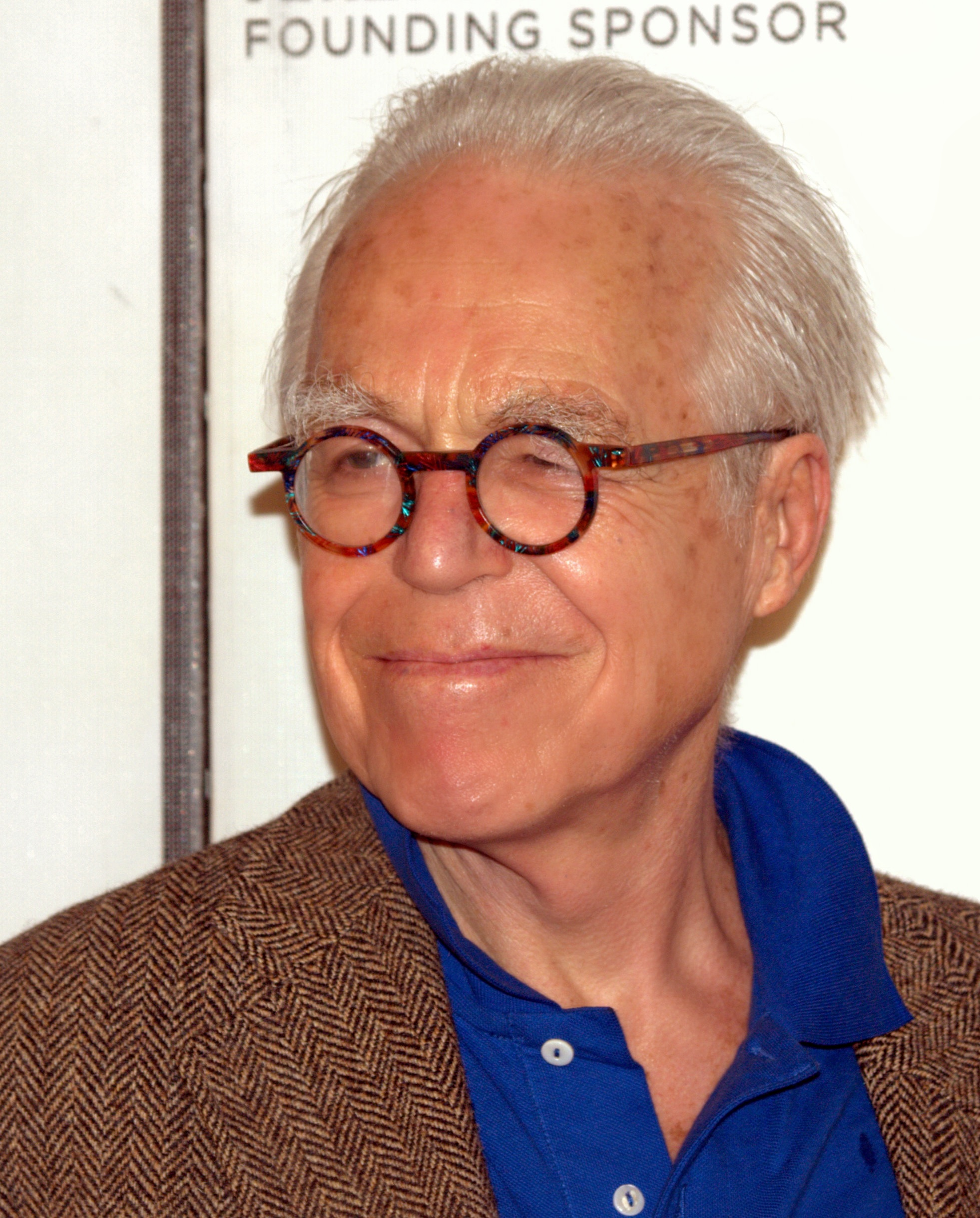
Author John Guare at the Tribeca Film Festival shortly before the Premiere of A Free Man of Color

== Production history and awards ==
The show was originally expected to be produced by the Public Theater to open in early 2009, but the engagement was postponed due to "lack of necessary funding".

When Guare first wrote the play it was about 5 hours long and had to undergo extensive revision ahead of its premiere.

A Free Man of Color premiered on Broadway at the Vivian Beaumont Theater. Previews were originally scheduled to begin on October 21, 2010, but were delayed until October 23, 2010. The show officially opened on November 18, 2010, in a limited engagement until January 9, 2011.

The creative team included director George C. Wolfe, set designer David Rockwell, costume designer Ann Hould-Ward, lighting designers Jules Fisher and Peggy Eisenhauer, and instrumental musician Jeanine Tesori.

The original cast were Jeffrey Wright in the lead role, Mos Def as Cupidon Murmur, Reg Rogers as Princepousse/Tallyrand, Joseph Marcell as Dr. Toubib, Arnie Burton as James Monroe, Robert Stanton as Georges Feydeau, Paul Dano as Meriwether Lewis, John McMartin as Thomas Jefferson, Veanne Cox as Mme. Mandragola, and Sara Gettelfinger as Doña Athene/Calliope.

A Free Man of Color was a finalist for the 2011 Pulitzer Prize for Drama.

== Themes ==
Through his writing Guare is able to display several different themes that have affected society for hundreds of years and continue to affect society today. Some of the themes noted include immorality which is demonstrated through Cornet's lack of empathy toward individuals after obtaining a large sum of money and becoming one of the most influential figures in New Orleans. Cornet establishes his morality when he stages a shooting in order to regain the respect from the men in New Orleans who have recently turned against him. Along with this sense of immorality is the corruption seen by characters during the play. Corruption is rooted throughout the play, most notably by Jacques Cornet who uses his money to obtain favors from individuals. Guare also develops the theme of race during the whole of the play in that Jacques Cornet loses everything after the battles of slavery come back into play in New Orleans after the country doubles its size due to the Louisiana Purchase.

== Response ==
The Wall Street Journal's Terry Teachout wrote in his review, "If neatness is what you expect from John Guare's "A Free Man of Color," you'll be doomed to disappointment. Mr. Guare's ambitious new play, which tells the fantastic tale of Jacques Cornet (Jeffrey Wright), a 19th-century millionaire playboy from New Orleans who happens to be black, has a cast of 33 and runs for 2½ crowded hours. Yes, it sprawls, but for all its hectic messiness, "A Free Man of Color" is one of the three or four most stirring new plays I've seen since I started writing this column seven years ago.".

Newsday's reviewer wrote, "Somewhere very far away - as far, say, as the final 15 minutes - "A Free Man of Color" becomes an important play. Finally, after 2 ½ hours of brain-blurring historical asides, strenuously costumed artifice and luxuriously overpopulated incoherence, the point and resonance of this crazy-ambitious collaboration between playwright John Guare and director George C. Wolfe fall deeply into place."

Michael Sommers praised the sets and costumes as "lavish", and said of the cast, "Wright furiously tears around as the flamboyant Jacques. Subtly depicting the fop's long-suffering servant Murmur, Mos also blazes for a bit as the fiery Toussaint. John McMartin wryly portrays a pragmatic Jefferson. Reg Rogers is very funny whether as Jacques' vengeful half-brother or the oily French diplomat Talleyrand. Veanne Cox and Peter Bartlett comically contrast as aristocratic refugees upset by New Orleans' raffish society while Nicole Beharie is winsome as a spunky country girl who soon comes to love it. Paul Dano, Nick Mennelland Arnie Burton brightly materialize as various personages."

The NY Daily News reporter also praised the cast, but added that it "doesn't add up to a satisfying evening". Elysa Gardener of USA Today gave a more positive review, calling the show "exhilarating. By abandoning subtlety throughout, Guare and Wolfe keep the tone consistent, and ensure that some scenes that might have seemed pedantic in another context make sense dramatically."
