= Onward Victoria =

- Music: Keith Herrmann
- Lyrics: Charlotte Anker; Irene Rosenberg
- Book: Charlotte Anker; Irene Rosenberg
- Basis: Life of Victoria Woodhull
- Productions: 1980 Broadway

Onward Victoria is a musical (1980) with a book and lyrics by Charlotte Anker and Irene Rosenberg, and music by Keith Herrmann. Its subject is Victoria Woodhull, the 19th-century woman who with her sister were the first women to operate a brokerage firm, at which they became millionaires, and started a newspaper.

== Production ==
This musical originated in 1979 as Unescorted Women, first produced off-off-Broadway by the Joseph Jefferson Theatre Company. With its budget sets and costumes, anachronistic pop score, and camp burlesque-style production numbers (including one in which Woodhull sang the praises of Beecher's physical endowment) intact, headed uptown the following year rechristened Onward Victoria.

After twenty-three previews - and with its closing notice already in place - the Broadway production, directed by Julianne Boyd and choreographed by Michael Shawn, opened on December 14, 1980 at the Martin Beck Theatre, where it ran for one performance.

A Broadway cast recording was released by Original Cast Records.

== Cast ==
The cast included Jill Eikenberry as Woodhull, Michael Zaslow as Henry Ward Beecher, with whom Woodhull is linked in a fictional romance that leads to the minister being tried for alienation of affections, Ted Thurston as Cornelius Vanderbilt, Laura Waterbury as Elizabeth Cady Stanton, Dorothy Holland as Susan B. Anthony, Gordon Stanley as Fleming, and Lenny Wolpe as restaurateur Charlie Delmonico.

== Awards ==
Theoni V. Aldredge was nominated for the Drama Desk Award for Outstanding Costume Design.

== Musical Numbers ==
Act I

Scene 1: Opening - New York City, 1871

- "The Age of Brass" - Victoria, Tennie, Henry, Beecher, Anthony Comstock, Theodore and Beth Tilton, Elizabeth Cady Standtion, Susan B. Anthony, Ensemble

Scene 2: Commodore Cornelius Vanderbilt's Office

- "Magnetic Healing" - Victoria, Tennie, Cornelius Vanderbilt

Scene 3: Victoria's Salon - Six Months Later

- "Curiosity" - William Evarts, Beth and Theodore Tilton, Elizabeth Cady Stanton, Cornelius Vanderbill, Ensemble

Scene 4: Plymouth Church, Brooklyn Heights

- "Beecher's Processional" - Beecher, Congregation

Scene 5: Woodhull and Clafin's Brokerage

- "I Depend on You" - Victoria and Tennie

Scene 6: Washington, D.C., Congress - May 24, 1871 Scene 7: Victoria's Campaign Tour

- "Victoria's Banner" - Victoria, Tennie, Elizabeth Cady Stanton, Susan B. Anthony, Ensemble
- "Changes" - Victoria

Scene 8: Beecher's Study - The Next Day Scene 9: Victoria's Brokerage/Beecher's Study - Three Months Later

- "A Taste of Forever" - Victoria, Theodore Tilton

Scene 10: Delmonico's Restaurant - Two Hours Later

- "Unescorted Women" - Charlie Delmonico, Tennie, Victoria, Ensemble

Act II

Scene 1: Victoria's Brokerage - The Next Day

- "Love and Joy" - Victoria, Henry Beecher

Scene 2: Beecher's Study - Two Months Later

- "Everyday I Do a Little Something for the Lord" - Comstock
- "It's Easy for Her" - Beecher

Scene 3: Victoria's Brokerage - Early Evening Scene 4: Steinway Hall

- "You Cannot Drown the Dreamer" - Victoria, Elizabeth

Scene 5: Victoria's Brokerage - Two Days Later

- "Respectable" - Tennie
- "Another Life" - Victoria

Scene 6: Brokerage/Street/Jail

- "Read It in The Weekly" - Victoria, Henry Beecher, Theodore Tilton, Tennie, Anthony Comstock, Newsboys, Readers

Scene 7: Exterior and Interior of Courtroom - Six Months Later

- "A Valentine for Beecher" - Ensemble
- "Beecher's Defense" - Victoria
- "Another Life (Reprise)" - Victoria, Henry Beecher
- "You Cannot Drown the Dreamer (Reprise)" - Victoria, Tennie
