= Fools (play) =

Play by Neil Simon

Fools is a comic fable by Neil Simon, set in the small village of Kulyenchikov, Ukraine, during the late 19th century. The story follows Leon Steponovich Tolchinsky, a schoolteacher who takes a new job educating Sophia, the daughter of Dr. Zubritsky and his wife, Lenya. Leon soon learns that there is a curse on the village that makes everyone stupid, but complications ensue when Leon falls in love with his pupil.

== Production ==
Under the title The Curse of Kulyenchikov, the play had its tryout at the Schubert Theatre in Boston from February 23, 1981 to March 21, 1981. With the exception of Gordon Davidson as director, the major cast and production team for the tryout were the same as described for the Broadway opening below.

With the revised title of Fools, the play premiered on Broadway at the Eugene O'Neill Theatre on April 6, 1981 and closed on May 9, 1981 after 40 performances. Directed by Mike Nichols, the cast included John Rubinstein, Harold Gould, Richard B. Shull, Florence Stanley, and Pamela Reed. The scenery was by John Lee Beatty, costumes by Patricia Zipprodt, lighting by Tharon Musser and music by John Rubinstein.

The play allegedly was written as the result of an agreement Simon made with his wife during their divorce proceedings. She was promised the profits of his next play, so he attempted to write something that never would last on Broadway.

=== Adaptations ===
The play was adapted as a stage musical in 1984 titled The Curse of Kulyenchikov, with book and music by Peter Melnick, lyrics by Pat Pattison, and direction by Paul Warner. It ran in April to May 1984 at the Old Library at Leverett House, at Harvard University.

With the permission of Simon, the play was adapted into another musical in 1990, this time with the title Kulyenchikov. It was produced in San Jose, California in November of that year. The revised libretto, and original music and lyrics were by San Francisco Bay Area playwright/composer Ted Kopulos. In addition to the score of 14 songs, an additional character was created - Alexei, Leon's con-artist uncle, who acted as an inadvertent love interest for Yenchna and demonstrated how even the smartest of con men can be beaten at their own game by the stupidest of villagers.

== Synopsis ==
=== Act One ===
Leon Tolchinsky, an ambitious young schoolteacher, arrives in the Ukrainian village of Kulyenchikov in order to educate a doctor's daughter, Sophia Zubritsky. Upon arrival, Leon meets several of the locals: Snetsky the shepherd, Mishkin the postman, Slovitch the butcher, and Yenchna the vendor. All of them seem rather unintelligent and hold tedious and confusing conversations. Leon makes his way to the Zubritsky home, finding Dr. and Mrs. Zubritsky to be similarly dimwitted.

Leon soon learns that the town's idiocy is the result of a curse: 200 years ago, the son of sorcerer Vladimir Yousekevitch fell in love with Sophia's ancestor, but her scholarly father married her to another man when he learned that the boy was illiterate. After his son committed suicide, Vladimir cursed the townspeople and their descendants to live as fools, forever trapped in Kulyenchikov. The curse can only be broken if Leon is able to educate Sophia, or if she marries a Yousekevitch. Count Gregor, the last surviving Yousekevitch, proposes to Sophia twice a day, but she always turns him down.

Leon is introduced to Sophia and is immediately lovestruck. He asks her a few simple questions, but she responds idiotically. Nevertheless, Leon resolves to break the curse, especially after he learns that those cursed are incapable of love. Count Gregor arrives for his evening marriage proposal, and Leon confronts him. Count Gregor warns Leon that if he can't educate Sophia within 24 hours of his arrival in Kulyenchikov, he must either leave the village or fall victim to the curse himself. Leon meets with Sophia again, and she affirms her desire to be able to love him. Leon promises that she will love him the next day.

=== Act Two ===
The next morning, Leon arrives at the Zubritsky home, eager to educate Sophia. He attempts and fails to teach her elementary mathematics, and the lesson soon spirals into a debate: Sophia tries to ask Leon questions to get to know him better, but he stubbornly insists on imparting her with knowledge, believing that students are not meant to ask questions, only answer them. As the deadline looms, Sophia urges Leon to leave Kulyenchikov before he too is cursed, but he resolves to stay with her and seemingly turns into a fool. The townspeople, who have gathered outside in hopes of seeing the curse broken, leave disappointed.

Once Leon and Sophia are alone, he reveals to her that he was merely pretending - the curse had no effect on him. Leon speculates that the curse is actually a psychological phenomenon which came about because the villagers have always been told they are stupid. Count Gregor enters, lamenting his villainous reputation. Leon convinces Gregor that he could be better liked if he adopted him and let him marry Sophia. This would break the curse in the eyes of the townspeople, as Sophia would technically be wed to a Yousekevitch. Count Gregor agrees, and Leon and Sophia are set to be wed. At the last minute, Count Gregor reveals that he tricked Leon into signing divorce papers instead of adoption papers, and forces Dr. Zubritsky to let him marry Sophia.

Leon, in a flash of inspiration, asks Mishkin the postman for his urgent letter, which has been mentioned throughout the play. The letter supposedly reveals that Leon is a Yousekevitch through a distant relation, though Leon explains to the audience that it is actually a bill from his college in Moscow. Leon and Sophia are wed, and the "curse" of Kulyenchikov is broken. Leon then narrates what happened to all the characters afterwards, mentioning that he and Sophia are happily raising a child and constantly learning from one another.

== Characters ==
- Leon Steponovitch Tolchinsky - the protagonist, a young schoolteacher who is sent to Kulyenchikov to teach Sophia. Breaks the fourth wall to narrate the story.
- Sophia Irena Elenya Zubritsky - Daughter of Dr. Nikolai and Lenya and love interest to Leon.
- Gregor Mikhailovitch Breznofsky Fyodor Yousekevitch ("Count Gregor") - the antagonist, the last descendant of Vladimir Yousekevitch who cursed Kulyenchikov with idiocy 200 years ago.
- Dr. Nikolai Zubritsky - Father of Sophia and husband of Lenya. Kulyenchikov's doctor.
- Lenya Zubritsky - Mother of Sophia and wife of Dr. Nikolai.
- Something-Something Snetsky - A shepherd known as “the sheep loser”.
- Mishkin - A young postman.
- Slovitch - An animal-loving butcher.
- Yenchna - A sweet but forgetful vendor.
- Magistrate - Timid judicial officer.

== Reception ==
In his review for The New York Times, Frank Rich wrote: "As one watches Mr. Simon, the director Mike Nichols and a topflight cast struggle to puff up this show, a feeling of unreality sets in. It's as if a team of brilliant high-priced surgeons has been assembled to operate on a splinter. While Mr. Simon has come up with a few funny moments, there are only so many jokes that anyone can make about stupidity. Once we learn that the town peddler sells flowers as whitefish, that the town doctor can't read his own eye chart and that the town shepherd can't find his sheep, there's an inevitability about every punch line."
