= Korean Health, Education, Information and Research Center =

Healthcare agency

The Korean Health, Education, Information and Research Center (KHEIR, Korean: 한인건강정보센터) is Los Angeles–based non-profit healthcare service agency established in 1986 to deliver medical services, including health education, health care, and social support, to the Korean American community, mainly assisting the low-income, recently immigrated, monolingual/limited English speaking Koreans.
