= David Hirson =

American dramatist (born 1958)

- Born: 1958 (age 67–68); New York City, U.S.
- Education: Yale University
- Occupation: Playwright
- Writing career
- Genre: Comedy
- Notable awards: Laurence Olivier Award for Best New Comedy (1992)

David Hirson (born 1958) is an American dramatist, best known for his award-winning Broadway comedies, La Bête and Wrong Mountain.

== Biography ==
Hirson was born in New York City to actress Alice and playwright Roger O. Hirson. He was educated at the Rye Country Day School. He studied at Oxford and Yale University, where he received a bachelor's degree in English literature.

== Awards and nominations ==
Awards

- 1991 Outer Critics Circle John Gassner Playwriting Award – La Bête
- 1992 Laurence Olivier Award for Best New Comedy – La Bête

Nominations

- 1991 Drama Desk Award for Outstanding New Play – La Bête

== Bibliography ==
- Hirson, David (1992). La Bête (First ed.). New York: Dramatists Play Service. OCLC 27061915.
- Hirson, David (2001). Wrong Mountain (First ed.). New York: Samuel French. ISBN 0-573-62967-6.
