= Shōgun: The Musical =

1990 stage musical

Shōgun
- The Musical
- Promotional Button
- Music: Paul Chihara
- Lyrics: John Driver
- Book: John Driver
- Basis: Shōgun by James Clavell
- Productions: 1990 Kennedy Center; 1990 Broadway

Shōgun: The Musical is a musical with a book and lyrics by John Driver and music by Paul Chihara.

Based on James Clavell's 1975 novel and the 1980 television mini-series of the same name, the musical centers on shipwrecked English sea captain John Blackthorne, who finds himself drawn into a political power play while involved in an illicit affair with a married noblewoman in 17th-century Japan. Clavell's novel was itself originally inspired by the true story of English navigator William Adams.

== History ==
Clavell himself initiated the project in 1982 and, when it remained in limbo for more than eight years, finally provided most of the financing required to get it mounted. Compressing his mammoth work, which had required twelve hours to tell fully on television, into a reasonable length for the theatre proved to be a daunting task. When the production opened at the Kennedy Center in Washington, D.C., it closely resembled Les Misérables and The Phantom of the Opera in size and scope, with a cast of thirty-eight characters, more than three hundred costumes, a libretto nearly entirely sung, and a running time of 3½ hours. Critics and audiences alike had difficulty following the convoluted plot, and it was decided to cut much of the music and replace it with dialogue. Composer Chihara objected and was dismissed. The leading man Peter Karrie was also let go and replaced by Philip Casnoff, who had originally auditioned but was rejected by producers for being too young and too American.

A revamped, considerably shorter show arrived in New York City. At the press preview shortly before opening night, Casnoff was struck by a piece of scenery in the middle of the second act, and the performance abruptly ended. His injuries were minor, and after a brief recuperation he returned to the show.

After eighteen previews, the Broadway production, directed and choreographed by Michael Smuin, opened on November 20, 1990 at the Marquis Theatre, where it ran for 72 performances. In addition to Casnoff, the cast included June Angela, Joseph Foronda, Eric Chan, JoAnn M. Hunter, Leslie Ishii, and Francis Ruivivar.

Despite a detailed plot synopsis in the Playbill, audiences were still confused by all of the action onstage. Critics found the special effects (including a shipwreck, an earthquake, and a battle fought on horseback in a snowstorm) and Patricia Zipprodt's costume designs to be impressive, but thought the score was weak and Smuin, whose background was ballet, had concentrated more on unnecessary dance sequences than he had on plot exposition.

== Casts ==
=== Original cast ===
| Character | Kennedy Center | Broadway |
| Character | 1990 | 1990 |
|---|---|---|
| John Blackthorne | Peter Karrie | Philip Casnoff |
| Lady Mariko | June Angela | June Angela |
| Lord Toranaga | Francis Ruivivar | Francis Ruivivar |
| Father Alvito | John Herrera | John Herrera |
| Lord Buntaro | Joseph Foronda | Joseph Foronda |
| Lord Ishido | Alan Muraoka | Alan Muraoka |

== Songs ==
Act I

- "Karma" - Orchestra
- "Night of Screams" - Sailor, John Blackthorne and Ensemble
- "This is Samurai" - Samurai
- "How Nice to See You" - Lord Toranaga, Lord Buntaro, Father Alvito and Lady Mariko
- "Impossible Eyes" - Lady Mariko and John Blackthorne
- "He Let Me Live" - Lady Mariko
- "Honto" - John Blackthorne
- "Assassination" - Father Alvito and Ferriera
- "Shogun" - Hostages
- "Royal Blood" - Lord Ishido and Lord Toranaga
- "An Island" - Lord Toranaga
- "No Word for Love" - Lady Mariko
- "Mad Rum Below/Escape" - John Blackthorne and Ensemble
- "Karma (Reprise)" - Toranaga and Ensemble
- "Born to Be Together" - Lady Mariko and John Blackthorne

Act II

- "Fireflies" - Ensemble, Lady Mariko and John Blackthorne
- "Sail Home" - John Blackthorne
- "Rum Below" - John Blackthorne, Lord Toranaga and Ensemble
- "Pillowing" - Gyoko, Kiku and Ladies
- "Born to Be Together (Reprise)" - Lady Mariko and John Blackthorne
- "No Man" - John Blackthorne
- "Cha-No-Yu" - Lady Mariko and Lord Buntaro
- "Absolution" - Father Alvito, An Acolyte, Ensemble and Lady Mariko
- "Poetry Competition" - Lord Ishido, Sazuko and Lady Mariko
- "Death Walk" - Ensemble and John Blackthorne
- "One Candle" - Lady Mariko and John Blackthorne
- "Ninja Raid" - Orchestra
- "One Candle (Reprise)" - Lady Mariko and John Blackthorne
- "Winter Battle" - Orchestra
- "Resolutions" - Lord Toranaga and Ensemble
- "Trio" - Lord Toranaga, John Blackthorne and Lady Mariko
- "Finale" - Ensemble

== Awards and nominations ==
- Tony Award for Best Actress in a Musical (June Angela, nominee)
- Tony Award for Best Costume Design (Patricia Zipprodt, nominee)
- Drama Desk Award for Outstanding Actress in a Musical (June Angela, nominee)
- Drama Desk Award for Outstanding Costumes (Patricia Zipprodt, winner)
- Theatre World Award (Francis Ruivivar, winner)
