= La Bête (play) =

1991 play by David Hirson

- 2000 University of Hawaii-Kennedy Theatre production window card
- Written by: David Hirson
- Original language: English
- Genre: Comedy
- Setting: 1654. Pezenas, France. Languedoc. Prince Conti's Estate.

Premiere
- Date premiered: February 10, 1991
- Place premiered: Eugene O'Neill Theatre; New York City

La Bête is a 1991 comedy play by American playwright David Hirson. Written in rhymed couplets of iambic pentameter, the Molière-inspired story, set in 17th-century France, pits dignified, stuffy Elomire, the head of the royal court-sponsored theatre troupe, against the foppish, frivolous street entertainer Valere, whom the troupe's patron, Prince Conti, wishes them to bring aboard. Despite Elomire's violent objections, the company is forced to perform one of Valere's own plays, which results in dramatic changes to the future of Elomire, Valere, and the company itself.

== Performance history ==
Following 15 previews, the Broadway production, produced by Stuart Ostrow and Andrew Lloyd Webber and directed by Richard Jones, opened on February 10, 1991 at the Eugene O'Neill Theatre, where it ran for only 25 performances. The cast included Dylan Baker, Michael Cumpsty, John Michael Higgins, Tom McGowan, William Mesnik, Suzie Plakson, and James Greene. Its Broadway run generated a loss of $2.3 million, making it one of the biggest lossmakers for a non-musical play on Broadway at the time.

The subsequent West End production was a critical and commercial success and won the Laurence Olivier Award for Best Comedy. The London cast included Alan Cumming, Jeremy Northam, Timothy Walker and Simon Treves.

Despite its failure on Broadway, the play has been a popular choice of regional theatre groups throughout the years.

Mark Rylance, David Hyde Pierce and Joanna Lumley starred in a new production in 2010, which premiered in London's West End before transferring to Broadway. Matthew Warchus directed the revival, which played from June 26 until September 4, 2010 at the Comedy Theatre, and then transferred to Broadway. Previews began at the Music Box Theatre on September 23, 2010 with an official opening on October 14, 2010.

== Awards and nominations ==
Awards

- 1991 Outer Critics Circle Award for Best New Playwright
- 1992 Olivier Award for Best Comedy of the Year

Nominations

- Tony Award for Best Actor in Play (McGowan)
- Tony Award for Best Featured Actor in a Play (Baker)
- Tony Award for Best Scenic Design
- Tony Award for Best Lighting Design
- Tony Award for Best Direction of a Play
- Drama Desk Award for Outstanding New Play
- Drama Desk Award for Outstanding Actor in a Play (McGowan)
- Drama Desk Award for Outstanding Featured Actor in a Play (Baker)
- Drama Desk Award for Outstanding Director of a Play
- Drama Desk Award for Outstanding Costumes
- Drama Desk Award for Outstanding Set Design
