= Gregory Gale =

American costume designer

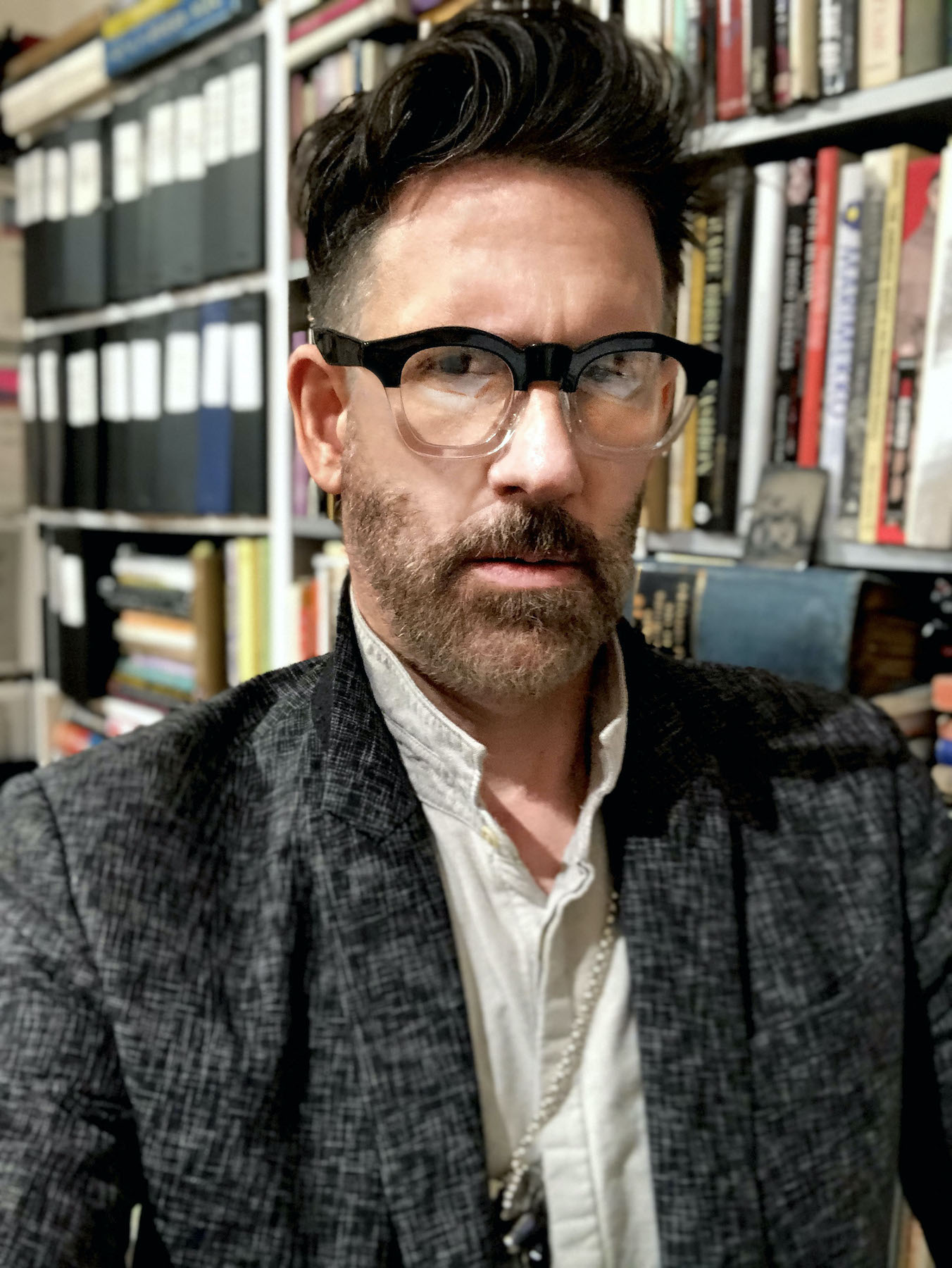
Gregory Gale in 2021

Gregory Gale is a New York-based costume designer.

== Career ==
Gale is a graduate of the Fashion Institute of Technology and is well known for his character-driven designs. In 2009 he was nominated for a Tony Award for Best Costume Design of a Musical for Rock of Ages, a musical that uses the classic rock hits from the 1980s. He was also nominated for a Tony Award for Best Costume Design of a Play in 2008 for his work on Cyrano de Bergerac. In 2007 Gale won the Lucille Lortel Award for Outstanding Costume Design for his work on The Voysey Inheritance. He was also nominated that same year for his work on The Milliner.

== Works ==
Gale has designed costumes for Broadway, International Productions, Off-Broadway, Regional Theaters, National Tours, Opera, Las Vegas and Special Events. Some of the most notable are:

Broadway

- Arcadia - (2011)
- Cyrano De Bergerac - (2007–2008) Tony Award and Henry Hewes Design Award nominations Best Costume Design of a Play
- Rock of Ages - (2009 to present day)Tony Award and Henry Hewes Design Award nominations Best Costume Design of a Musical. Other productions include: West End, Toronto and Australia
- The Wedding Singer - (2006) Drama Desk Nomination
- Urinetown - (2001–2004) Lucille Lortel Award nomination
- Band In Berlin - (1999)

Off-Broadway

- Bunnicula - (2013)
- Now. Here. This. - (2012)
- Rock of Ages - (2008–2009)
- The Third Story - (2008) Henry Hewes Design Award Nomination
- The Voysey Inheritance - (2006–2007) Lucille Lortel Award Winner and Henry Hewes Design Award nomination Best Costume Design of a Play
- The Milliner - (2006)
- Pig Farm, a play by Greg Kotis - (2006)
- Burleigh Grimes - (2006)
- Rope - (2005)
- The Downtown Plays - (2004)
- The Thing About Men - (2003)
- Bright Ideas - (2003)
- Mondo Drama - (2003)
- The Dazzle - (2002)
- Free to Be You and Me - (2002)
- The Dark Kalamazoo - (2002)
- Rude Entertainment - (2001)
- Urinetown - (2001) Lucille Lortel Award nomination
- The Torch-Bearers - (2000)
- The Country Club - (1999) Drama Desk Awards nomination
- Hope is the Thing With Feathers - (1998)
- As Thousands Cheer - (1998)
- Uncle Tom's Cabin - (1997)
- Night of the Tribades - (1993)
- The Stronger - (1993)
- Mary Stuart - (1992)
- The Infernal Machine - (1990)
- The Prince of Homburg - (1990)

Regional

- How to Succeed in Business Without Really Trying - (Goodspeed Opera House)
- Bombshells - (Milwaukee Repertory Theater)
- The Man Who Came to Dinner - (Alley Theater Houston)
- Rich and Famous - (A.C.T. San Francisco)
- The Third Story - (La Jolla Playhouse)
- A Flea in Her Ear - (Williamstown Theater Festival)
- The Great Game - (Broadway Previews at Duke)
- High Button Shoes - (Goodspeed Opera House)
- Seven Brides for Seven Brothers - (Goodspeed Opera House)
- The Pajama Game - (Goodspeed Opera House)
- Crush the Infamous Thing - (Coconut Grove Playhouse)
- Lives of the Saints, a play anthology by David Ives - (Berkshire Theater Festival)
- Merton of the Movies - (Geffen Playhouse)
- Oklahoma! - (Ordway Theater)
- Zorro - (TUTS Houston)
- Rhinoceros - (New Jersey Shakespeare)

National Tours

- Bunnicula
- Rock of Ages
- Urinetown
- Oh, Figaro - (National Theater of the Deaf)
- The Comedy of Errors - (The Acting Company)

Opera

- The Magic Flute - (Chicago Opera Theater)
- Bitter Sweet - (Bard Summerscape)

Las Vegas

- Rock of Ages - (Venetian Hotel)
- Surf, the Musical - (Planet Hollywood)

Special Events

- FIFA Conference Opening Ceremony Federation Internationale de Football Association - (2009)
- The New York Chocolate Show - Chocolate Fashion Show - (2007, 2009)
- Opening Ceremony Mass Celebration of the Pope's Visit to Yankee Stadium - (2007)
- Sex and the City Film DVD Release Party at the New York Public Library - (2007)
