= Jonathan Bixby =

American costume designer (1959–2001)

- Born: Jonathan Charles Bixby; June 21, 1959; Delaware County, Pennsylvania, U.S.
- Died: April 29, 2001 (aged 41); New York City, U.S.
- Occupation: Costume designer

Jonathan Charles Bixby (June 21, 1959 – April 29, 2001) was a costume designer and a founding member of Drama Dept., a New York-based theater company.

== Background ==
Bixby was born June 21, 1959, in Delaware County, Pennsylvania. He attended and graduated from Penncrest High School in 1977. He was a performer in Emanon, the theatrical group at Penncrest, mentored by Judy Roman. He left Mansfield College after his first year and moved to New York where he enrolled in the renowned Lester Polikoff School of Set and Costume Design to pursue his love of the stage. He was at that time the youngest person ever accepted at Polikoff.

Jonathan Bixby died April 29, 2001, at Cabrini Medical Center Hospice in New York City due to complications from colon cancer.

== Works ==
Bixby served as the costume designer on many of the Drama Dept's productions, including The Torch-Bearers; Country Club (2000 Drama Desk nomination); As Bees In Honey Drown and June Moon. Among Bixby's Broadway credits are Band In Berlin, the revival of Hello Dolly and Street Corner Symphony. Numerous other credits include Strike Up the Band and The Tenderloin directed by John Rando (City Centers Encores! series); The Coconuts (American Place Theater - 1996 Art Deco Society Award); Sheba (the Jewish Rep.); Advice From a Caterpillar (Lucille Lortell); The Skin of Our Teeth; Man Is Man; The Three Sisters; Galileo; Life is a Dream and The Importance of Being Earnest (Jean Cocteau Repertory).

Jonathan Bixby and his designing partner Gregory Gale designed the Broadway hit Urinetown (Lucille Lortel Nomination). In 2002 Bixby and Gale received the Theater Development Fund Irene Sharaff Young Master Award.

Among the Regional theater productions he created costumes for were Rhinoceros (New Jersey Shakespeare Festival); Merton of the Movies (Geffen Playhouse); Lives of the Saints (Berkshire Theater Festival); Sayonara - LA Drama Critics Award (Theater of the Stars, Houston - Seattle 5th Ave. and Los Angeles); June Moon (McCarter Theater); Man of La Mancha and Oklahoma! (Birmingham Theater); A Streetcar Named Desire and The Caucasian Chalk Circle (Bloomsberg Theater Ensemble).

His unique imagination was expressed in the costumes he designed for the long touring international Cirque Ingenieux, and designs for many international and U.S. touring companies, including The Sound of Music, Brigadoon, The Wiz, Evita, My Fair Lady, West Side Story, Jesus Christ Superstar, Tango Passion (Europe), The King and I (West End, USA and Japan) and Hello Dolly (Paris Premiere).

His film work includes Angel Passing with Hume Cronyn and Teresa Wright (Sundance Festival), Eventual Wife and Teenage Mutant Ninja Turtles:Coming Out of Their Shells Tour Video. Along with his Daytime Emmy award-winning TV work with Carol Luiken on All My Children, Bixby also served as a costume designer on the ABC daytime series One Life to Live.
