= Theoni V. Aldredge =

American costume designer (1922–2011)

Theoni Aldredge
- Born: Theoni Athanasiou Vachlioti; August 22, 1922; Thessaloniki, Kingdom of Greece
- Died: January 21, 2011 (aged 88); Stamford, Connecticut, U.S.
- Education: Art Institute of Chicago (BFA)
- Occupation: Costume designer
- Spouse: Tom Aldredge (m. 1953)
- Relatives: Deni (or Denny) Vachlioti (cousin)

Theoni V. Aldredge (August 22, 1922 – January 21, 2011) was a Greek-American stage and screen costume designer. During her career she won an Academy Award, a BAFTA Award, and three Tony Awards, as well as was nominated for three Primetime Emmy Awards.

== Biography ==
Born Theoni Athanasiou Vachliotis in Thessaloniki in 1922, Aldredge received her training at the American School in Athens. She emigrated to the United States in 1949 and attended the Goodman School of Drama at the Art Institute of Chicago (now at DePaul University) in Chicago on a scholarship. Her first Broadway theatre assignment was in 1959, designing the wardrobe for Geraldine Page in Tennessee Williams' Sweet Bird of Youth; her last was the 2006 revival of A Chorus Line. For twenty years, she was the principal designer for producer Joseph Papp and also designed several musicals for Michael Bennett.

== Career ==
One of the most honored costume designers of the American theatre, Aldredge received three Tony Awards (for Annie, Barnum, and La Cage aux Folles), as well as 11 other Tony nominations, including such productions as A Chorus Line, 42nd Street, and Dreamgirls. She received numerous honors from the Drama Desk awards and other theatrical groups. In 2000, she received the Costume Designers Guild Career Achievement Award. In 2002, she received the Irene Sharaff Lifetime Achievement Award from the Theatre Development Fund.

Aldredge worked extensively in film and television as well. Her productions included Network, Eyes of Laura Mars, and Rich and Famous. She received the Oscar and a British Academy Award for The Great Gatsby in 1974. Her designs for the film were adapted for a clothing line sold exclusively by Bloomingdale's in Manhattan.

== Personal life ==
She was the wife of American actor Tom Aldredge from 1953 until her death from a cardiac arrest on January 21, 2011, aged 88, in a Stamford, Connecticut hospital. He died six months later, on July 22, 2011, aged 83, from lymphoma.

== Productions ==
=== Broadway ===
- A Chorus Line (2006 revival)
- Follies (2001 revival)
- Annie (1997 revival)
- Three Sisters (1997 revival)
- The School for Scandal (1995 revival)
- Nick & Nora (1991)
- The Secret Garden (1991)
- Oh, Kay! (1990 revival)
- Gypsy (1989 revival)
- Chess (1988)
- Dreamgirls (1987 revival)
- The Rink (1984)
- La Cage aux Folles (1983)
- Private Lives (1983 revival)
- Dreamgirls (1981)
- Onward Victoria (1981)
- Woman of the Year (1981)
- 42nd Street (1980)
- Barnum (1980)
- Ballroom (1979)
- The Grand Tour (1979)
- Annie (1977)
- Threepenny Opera (1977 revival)
- The Belle of Amherst (1976)
- The Eccentricities of a Nightingale (1976)
- A Chorus Line (1975)
- That Championship Season (1972)
- Two Gentlemen of Verona (1971)
- The Incomparable Max (1971)
- The Only Game in Town (1968)
- I Never Sang for My Father (1968)
- You Know I Can't Hear You When the Water's Running (1967)
- Little Murders (1967)
- Illya Darling (1967)
- A Delicate Balance (1966)
- Cactus Flower (1965)
- Luv (1964)
- Anyone Can Whistle (1964)
- I Can Get It for You Wholesale (1962)
- The Best Man (1960)

=== Film ===
- The Mirror Has Two Faces (1996)
- The First Wives Club (1996)
- Mrs. Winterbourne (1996)
- Addams Family Values (1993)
- Moonstruck (1987)
- Ghostbusters (1984)
- Annie (1982)
- Can't Stop the Music (1980)
- Loving Couples (1980)
- The Rose (1979)
- The Champ (1979)
- Eyes of Laura Mars (1978)
- The Cheap Detective (1978)
- Network (1976)
- Three Days Of The Condor (1975)
- The Great Gatsby (1974)
- I Never Sang for My Father (1970)
- Last Summer (1969)
- No Way To Treat A Lady (1968)

== Awards and nominations ==
- 2001 Tony Award Best Costume Design (Follies, nominee)
- 1991 Tony Award Best Costume Design (The Secret Garden, nominee)
- 1990 Tony Award Best Costume Design (Gypsy, nominee)
- 1984 Tony Award Best Costume Design (La Cage aux Folles, winner)
- 1984 Drama Desk Award Outstanding Costume Design (La Cage aux Folles, winner)
- 1982 Tony Award Best Costume Design (Dreamgirls, nominee)
- 1982 Drama Desk Award Outstanding Costume Design (Dreamgirls, nominee)
- 1981 Tony Award Best Costume Design (42nd Street, nominee)
- 1981 Drama Desk Award Outstanding Costume Design (42nd Street, winner)
- 1981 Drama Desk Award Outstanding Costume Design (Onward Victoria, nominee)
- 1980 Tony Award Best Costume Design (Barnum, winner)
- 1979 Tony Award Best Costume Design (Ballroom, nominee)
- 1979 Drama Desk Award Outstanding Costume Design (Ballroom, nominee)
- 1977 Tony Award Best Costume Design (Annie, winner)
- 1977 Tony Award Best Costume Design (Threepenny Opera, nominee)
- 1977 Drama Desk Award Outstanding Costume Design (Annie, winner)
- 1976 Tony Award Best Costume Design (A Chorus Line, nominee)
- 1976 Drama Desk Award Outstanding Costume Design (Trelawny of the Wells, nominee)
- 1974 Tony Award Best Costume Design (The Au Pair Man, nominee)
- 1974 Academy Award Outstanding Costume Design (The Great Gatsby, winner)
- 1974 British Academy Award (BAFTA) Outstanding Costume Design (The Great Gatsby, winner)
- 1973 Tony Award Best Costume Design (Much Ado About Nothing, nominee)
- 1973 Drama Desk Award Outstanding Costume Design (Much Ado About Nothing, winner)
- 1972 Tony Award Best Costume Design (Two Gentlemen of Verona, nominee)
- 1972 Drama Desk Award Outstanding Costume Design (Two Gentlemen of Verona, winner)
- 1970 Drama Desk Award Outstanding Costume Design (Peer Gynt, winner)
- 1961 Tony Award Best Costume Design (The Devil's Advocate, nominee)
