= Patricia Zipprodt =

American costume designer

- Born: February 24, 1925; Chicago, Illinois, US
- Died: July 17, 1999 (aged 74); Greenwich Village, New York, US
- Education: Bradford Junior College; Wellesley College; Fashion Institute of Technology
- Occupation: costume designer
- Spouse: Colonel O'Brien

Patricia Zipprodt (February 24, 1925 – July 17, 1999) was an American costume designer. She was known for her technique of painting fabrics and thoroughly researching a project's subject matter, especially when it was a period piece. During a career that spanned four decades, she worked with such Broadway theatre legends as Jerome Robbins, Harold Prince, Gower Champion, David Merrick, and Bob Fosse.

== Biography ==
Born in Chicago, Illinois, Zipprodt attended Bradford Junior College for her freshman year and then transferred to Wellesley College, where she abandoned her plan to become a medical illustrator and concentrated on psychology and sociology. After graduation, she moved to New York City and, after seeing a performance by the New York City Ballet, decided to use her artistic talent for a career in costume design. She studied at the Fashion Institute of Technology and apprenticed with Charles James and Irene Sharaff. Her first job was as a puppeteer for the Good Teeth Council for Children in 1947.

Her first Broadway credit was The Potting Shed, a play by Graham Greene, in 1957. She went on to design more than 50 productions over the next 43 years. In 1992, she was inducted into the Theatre Hall of Fame. She also designed for the New York City Ballet, the Joffrey Ballet, the Houston Ballet, American Ballet Theatre, the New York City Opera, and the Metropolitan Opera. She designed costumes and masks for the long-running off-Broadway production of the Jean Genet play The Blacks in the early 1960s.

Zipprodt's feature film credits include The Graduate, Last of the Mobile Hot Shots, and 1776. She designed television adaptations of The Glass Menagerie, Alice in Wonderland, and Sunday in the Park with George.

In 1946, following her graduation from Wellesley, Zipprodt had returned to Chicago, where she met Lieut. Col. Robert O'Brien Jr. He proposed, but she declined because she wanted to pursue a career. More than forty years later, the retired and widowed O'Brien saw her biography in Playbill and contacted her via Brandeis University, where she was an artist in residence.

In 1983, Zipprodt received a Tony Award nomination for her work on Alice in Wonderland, produced by The Mirror Theater Ltd’s Sabra Jones. Zipprodt’s designs were exact recreations of the John Tenniel drawings for the original publication of the book Alice in Wonderland.

== Death ==
Colonel O'Brien and Zipprodt were married on June 5, 1993, and remained married until his death in 1998. Zipprodt died of cancer on July 17, 1999, at her home in Greenwich Village. She was 74 years old.

== Productions ==
- Miss Lonelyhearts (1957)
- Sunday in New York (1961)
- She Loves Me (1963)
- Fiddler on the Roof (1964)
- Anya (1965)
- Cabaret (1966)
- The Little Foxes (1967)
- Plaza Suite (1968)
- Zorba (1968)
- 1776 (1969)
- Georgy (1970)
- Pippin (1972)
- Mack & Mabel (1974)
- Chicago (1975)
- The Leaves Are Fading (ballet by Antony Tudor, ABT, 1975)
- Poor Murderer (1976)
- King of Hearts (1978)
- Fools (1981)
- Brighton Beach Memoirs (1983)
- Alice in Wonderland (1983)
- Sweet Charity (1986)
- Into the Woods (1987)
- Jerome Robbins' Broadway (1989)
- Cat on a Hot Tin Roof (1990)
- Shogun: The Musical (1990)
- The Crucible (1991)
- My Favorite Year (1992)
- My Fair Lady (1993)

== Awards and nominations ==
- 1997 Theatre Development Fund's Irene Sharaff Award for Lifetime Achievement in Costume Design (winner)
- 1994 Drama Desk Award for Outstanding Costume Design (My Fair Lady, nominee)
- 1991 Induction into the American Theater Hall of Fame
- 1991 Tony Award for Best Costume Design (Shogun, nominee)
- 1991 Drama Desk Award for Outstanding Costumes (Shogun, winner)
- 1986 Tony Award for Best Costume Design (Sweet Charity, winner)
- 1984 Tony Award for Best Costume Design (Sunday in the Park with George, nominee)
- 1984 Drama Desk Award for Outstanding Costume Design (Sunday in the Park with George, nominee)
- 1983 Tony Award for Best Costume Design (Alice in Wonderland, nominee)
- 1983 Drama Desk Award for Outstanding Costume Design (Alice in Wonderland, nominee)
- 1981 Drama Desk Award for Outstanding Costume Design (Fools, nominee)
- 1979 Drama Desk Award for Outstanding Costume Design (King of Hearts, winner)
- 1976 Tony Award for Best Costume Design (Chicago, nominee)
- 1975 Tony Award for Best Costume Design (Mack & Mabel, nominee)
- 1973 Tony Award for Best Costume Design (Pippin, nominee)
- 1973 Drama Desk Award for Outstanding Costume Design (Pippin, winner)
- 1971 Wellesley's Alumnae Achievement Award (winner)
- 1969 Tony Award for Best Costume Design (Zorba, nominee)
- 1969 Drama Desk Award for Outstanding Costume Design (1776, winner)
- 1969 Drama Desk Award for Outstanding Costume Design (Zorba, winner)
- 1967 Tony Award for Best Costume Design (Cabaret, winner)
- 1965 Tony Award for Best Costume Design (Fiddler on the Roof, winner)
