= Special Tony Award =

Theater award

- Awarded for: Special Tony Award
- Location: United States New York City
- Presented by: American Theatre Wing The Broadway League
- Website: TonyAwards.com

The Special Tony Award category includes the Lifetime Achievement Tony Award and the Special Tony Award. These are non-competitive honorary awards, and the titles have changed over the years. The Tony Award for Lifetime Achievement in the Theatre is to "honor an individual for the body of their work." The Tony Award for Best Special Theatrical Event was a competitive award, given from 2001 to 2009. Another non-competitive Tony award is the Tony Honors for Excellence in Theatre, to "recognize the achievements of individuals and organizations that do not fit into any of the competitive categories."

== Award winners ==
=== 1940s ===
| Year | Recipient | Reason |
|---|---|---|
| 1947; 1st Tony Awards | Dora Chamberlain | Unfailing courtesy as treasurer of the Martin Beck Theatre |
| 1947; 1st Tony Awards | Ira and Rita Katzenberg | Enthusiasm as inveterate first-nighters |
| 1947; 1st Tony Awards | Jules Leventhal | Being the season's most prolific backer and producer |
| 1947; 1st Tony Awards | Burns Mantle | The annual publication of The Ten Best Plays |
| 1947; 1st Tony Awards | P. A. MacDonald | Intricate construction for the production of If the Shoe Fits |
| 1947; 1st Tony Awards | Vincent Sardi Sr. | Providing a transient home and comfort station for theatre folk at Sardi's for 20 years |
| 1948; 2nd Tony Awards | Rosalind Gilder | Contribution to theatre through a publication for Theatre Arts |
| 1948; 2nd Tony Awards | Vera Allen | Distinguished wing volunteer worker through the war and after |
| 1948; 2nd Tony Awards | Paul Beisman | Progressive Theatre Operators to Operator of the American Theatre, St. Louis |
| 1948; 2nd Tony Awards | Joe E. Brown | Spreading theatre to the country in Harvey, while the originals perform in New York |
| 1948; 2nd Tony Awards | Cast of The Importance of Being Earnest | Outstanding Foreign Company |
| 1948; 2nd Tony Awards | Robert W. Dowling | Progressive theatre operators to President of City Investing Company, St. Louis |
| 1948; 2nd Tony Awards | Experimental Theatre Inc. | Experiment in theatre |
| 1948; 2nd Tony Awards | June Lockhart | Outstanding Performance by a Newcomer for For Love or Money |
| 1948; 2nd Tony Awards | Mary Martin | Spreading theatre to the country in Annie Get Your Gun, while the originals perform in New York |
| 1948; 2nd Tony Awards | George Pierce | Twenty-five years of courteous and efficient service as a backstage doorman at the Empire Theatre |
| 1948; 2nd Tony Awards | James Whitmore | Outstanding Performance by a Newcomer for Command Decision |
| 1949; 3rd Tony Awards | —N/a | |

=== 1950s ===
| Year | Recipient | Reason |
|---|---|---|
| 1950; 4th Tony Awards | Maurice Evans | Special recognition for guiding the City Center Theatre Company through a highly successful season |
| 1950; 4th Tony Awards | Philip Faversham | Representing those workers from the American Theatre Wing's hospital program who had performed hospital volunteer work outside of New York |
| 1950; 4th Tony Awards | Brock Pemberton (posthumous) | Founder of awards and its original chairman |
| 1951; 5th Tony Awards | Ruth Green | Her services as a volunteer in arranging reservation and seating for the five Tony Awards |
| 1952; 6th Tony Awards | Charles Boyer | His performance in Don Juan in Hell, thereby assisting in a new theatre trend |
| 1952; 6th Tony Awards | Judy Garland | An important contribution to the revival of vaudeville through her recent stint at the Palace Theatre |
| 1952; 6th Tony Awards | Edward Kook | His contributing to and encouraging the development of stage lighting and electronics |
| 1953; 7th Tony Awards | Danny Kaye | Heading a variety bill at the Palace Theatre. Equity Community Theatre |
| 1953; 7th Tony Awards | Beatrice Lillie | Her performance in An Evening with Beatrice Lillie |
| 1954; 8th Tony Awards | —N/a | |
| 1955; 9th Tony Awards | Proscenium Productions | Presented to Warren Enters, Robert Merriman and Sybil Trubin for high quality and viewpoints shown in The Way of the World and Thieves Carnival |
| 1956; 10th Tony Awards | Fourth Street Chekov Theatre | |
| 1956; 10th Tony Awards | City Center | |
| 1956; 10th Tony Awards | The New York Public Library Theatre Collection | Presented to founder George Freedley for its distinguished service to the theatre |
| 1956; 10th Tony Awards | The Shakespearewrights | |
| 1956; 10th Tony Awards | The Threepenny Opera | Presented to producer Carmen Capalbo for her distinguished Off-Broadway production |
| 1957; 11th Tony Awards | American Shakespeare Festival | |
| 1957; 11th Tony Awards | Jean-Louis Barrault | |
| 1957; 11th Tony Awards | Robert Russell Bennett | |
| 1957; 11th Tony Awards | William Hammerstein | |
| 1957; 11th Tony Awards | Joseph Harbuck | His performance in Auntie Mame |
| 1957; 11th Tony Awards | Paul Shyre | |
| 1958; 12th Tony Awards | Louise Heims Beck | Fifteen years of untiring dedication to the American Theatre Wing, which she served as treasurer, secretary and chairman of the board of directors |
| 1958; 12th Tony Awards | New York Shakespeare Festival | Presenting free performances in Central Park and the Hecksher Theater |
| 1959; 13th Tony Awards | Russel Crouse and Howard Lindsay | A collaboration that lasted longer than Gilbert and Sullivan |
| 1959; 13th Tony Awards | John Gielgud | Contribution to theatre for his extraordinary insight into the writings of Shakespeare as demonstrated in his one-man play, Ages of Man |
| 1959; 13th Tony Awards | Cast of La Plume de Ma Tante | Contribution to the theatre |

=== 1960s ===
| Year | Recipient | Reason |
|---|---|---|
| 1960; 14th Tony Awards | Burgess Meredith and James Thurber | Their production of A Thurber Carnival |
| 1960; 14th Tony Awards | John D. Rockefeller III | Vision and leadership in creating the Lincoln Center, a landmark of theatre encompassing the performing arts |
| 1961; 15th Tony Awards | David Merrick | In recognition of a fabulous production record over the last seven years |
| 1961; 15th Tony Awards | The Theatre Guild | Organizing the first repertory to go abroad for the State Department; presented to Warren Caro |
| 1962; 16th Tony Awards | Brooks Atkinson | His influential theatre critique in The New York Times |
| 1962; 16th Tony Awards | Richard Rodgers | All he has done for young people in the theatre and for taking the men of the orchestra out of the pit and putting them on stage in No Strings |
| 1962; 16th Tony Awards | Franco Zeffirelli | His designs and direction of the Old Vic's Romeo and Juliet |
| 1963; 17th Tony Awards | Alan Bennett, Peter Cook, Jonathan Miller and Dudley Moore | Their brilliance in Beyond the Fringe, which has shattered all the old concepts of comedy |
| 1963; 17th Tony Awards | Irving Berlin | His distinguished contribution to the musical theatre for these many years |
| 1963; 17th Tony Awards | W. McNeil Lowry | On behalf of the Ford Foundation for his and their distinguished support of the American Theatre |
| 1964; 18th Tony Awards | Eva Le Gallienne | Celebrating her 50th year as an actress, honored for her work with the National Repertory Theatre |
| 1965; 19th Tony Awards | Gilbert Miller | Producing 88 plays and musicals and for his perseverance which has helped to keep New York and theatre alive |
| 1965; 19th Tony Awards | Oliver Smith | |
| 1966; 20th Tony Awards | Helen Menken | A lifetime of devotion and dedicated service to the Broadway theatre |
| 1967; 21st Tony Awards | —N/a | |
| 1968; 22nd Tony Awards | APA-Phoenix Theatre | |
| 1968; 22nd Tony Awards | Pearl Bailey | |
| 1968; 22nd Tony Awards | Carol Channing | |
| 1968; 22nd Tony Awards | Maurice Chevalier | |
| 1968; 22nd Tony Awards | Marlene Dietrich | |
| 1968; 22nd Tony Awards | Audrey Hepburn | |
| 1968; 22nd Tony Awards | David Merrick | |
| 1969; 23rd Tony Awards | Leonard Bernstein | |
| 1969; 23rd Tony Awards | Carol Burnett | |
| 1969; 23rd Tony Awards | Rex Harrison | |
| 1969; 23rd Tony Awards | The National Theatre of Great Britain | |
| 1969; 23rd Tony Awards | The Negro Ensemble Company | |

=== 1970s ===
| Year | Recipient | Reason |
|---|---|---|
| 1970; 24th Tony Awards | Noël Coward | Multiple and immortal contributions to the theatre |
| 1970; 24th Tony Awards | Lynn Fontanne and Alfred Lunt | |
| 1970; 24th Tony Awards | New York Shakespeare Festival | Pioneering efforts on behalf of new plays |
| 1970; 24th Tony Awards | Barbra Streisand | Star of the Decade |
| 1971; 25th Tony Awards | Ingram Ash | Decades of devoted service to the theatre |
| 1971; 25th Tony Awards | Elliot Norton | Distinguished theatrical commentary |
| 1971; 25th Tony Awards | Playbill | Chronicling Broadway through the years |
| 1971; 25th Tony Awards | Roger L. Stevens | |
| 1972; 26th Tony Awards | Fiddler on the Roof | Presented to Harold Prince for becoming the longest-running musical in Broadway history |
| 1972; 26th Tony Awards | Ethel Merman | |
| 1972; 26th Tony Awards | Richard Rodgers | |
| 1972; 26th Tony Awards | The Theatre Guild-American Theatre Society | Its many years of service to audiences for touring shows; presented to Warren Caro |
| 1973; 27th Tony Awards | John Lindsay (Mayor of New York City) | |
| 1973; 27th Tony Awards | Shubert Organization | |
| 1973; 27th Tony Awards | The Actor's Fund of America | |
| 1974; 28th Tony Awards | Actors' Equity Association | |
| 1974; 28th Tony Awards | A Moon for the Misbegotten | An outstanding dramatic revival of an American classic |
| 1974; 28th Tony Awards | Candide | An outstanding contribution to the artistic development of the musical theatre |
| 1974; 28th Tony Awards | Peter Cook and Dudley Moore | Co-stars and authors of Good Evening |
| 1974; 28th Tony Awards | Harold Friedlander | Theatre Award '74 |
| 1974; 28th Tony Awards | Bette Midler | Adding lustre to the Broadway season |
| 1974; 28th Tony Awards | Liza Minnelli | Adding lustre to the Broadway season |
| 1974; 28th Tony Awards | The Theatre Development Fund | |
| 1974; 28th Tony Awards | John F. Wharton | Theatre Award '74 |
| 1975; 29th Tony Awards | Al Hirschfeld | Fifty years of theatrical cartoons |
| 1976; 30th Tony Awards | George Abbott | Lawrence Langner Award |
| 1976; 30th Tony Awards | Richard Burton | |
| 1976; 30th Tony Awards | Circle in the Square | Twenty-five continuous years of quality productions |
| 1976; 30th Tony Awards | Thomas H. Fitzgerald (Posthumous) | Gifted lighting in countless Broadway shows and many Tony telecasts |
| 1976; 30th Tony Awards | Mathilde Pincus | Outstanding service to the Broadway musical theatre |
| 1977; 31st Tony Awards | Cheryl Crawford | Lawrence Langner Award |
| 1977; 31st Tony Awards | Equity Liberty Theatre | |
| 1977; 31st Tony Awards | Barry Manilow | |
| 1977; 31st Tony Awards | National Theatre of the Deaf | |
| 1977; 31st Tony Awards | Diana Ross | |
| 1977; 31st Tony Awards | Lily Tomlin | |
| 1978; 32nd Tony Awards | Irving Berlin | Lawrence Langner Award |
| 1978; 32nd Tony Awards | Stan Dragoti and Charles Moss | To the creators of the I Love New York Broadway show tours and its sponsor, the New York State Department of Commerce |
| 1979; 33rd Tony Awards | Walter F. Diehl | Being an active force in advancing the well-being of the Broadway theatre and of theatre nationally |
| 1979; 33rd Tony Awards | Eugene O'Neill Memorial Theater Center | |
| 1979; 33rd Tony Awards | Henry Fonda | |
| 1979; 33rd Tony Awards | Richard Rodgers | Lawrence Langner Award |

=== 1980s ===
| Year | Recipient | Reason |
|---|---|---|
| 1980; 34th Tony Awards | Richard Fitzgerald | Installing the infrared system in Broadway theatres, thus bringing the compassion and dedication of making theatergoing for those with impaired hearing, rewarding and enjoyable |
| 1980; 34th Tony Awards | Goodspeed Musicals | |
| 1980; 34th Tony Awards | Helen Hayes | Lawrence Langner Award |
| 1980; 34th Tony Awards | Mary Tyler Moore | Her performance in Whose Life Is It Anyway? |
| 1980; 34th Tony Awards | Hobe Morrison | Theatre Award '80 |
| 1981; 35th Tony Awards | Lena Horne | Her performance in Lena Horne: The Lady and Her Music |
| 1982; 36th Tony Awards | Radio City Music Hall | Theatre Award '82 |
| 1982; 36th Tony Awards | The Actors' Fund of America | |
| 1982; 36th Tony Awards | Warner Communications | Theatre Award '82 |
| 1983; 37th Tony Awards | —N/a | |
| 1984; 38th Tony Awards | A Chorus Line | In honor of becoming Broadway's longest-running musical |
| 1984; 38th Tony Awards | Peter Feller | A master craftsman who has devoted forty years to theatre stagecraft and magic |
| 1984; 38th Tony Awards | Al Hirschfeld | Brooks Atkinson Award for Lifetime Achievement in the Theatre |
| 1984; 38th Tony Awards | La Tragedie de Carmen | Outstanding achievement in musical theatre |
| 1985; 39th Tony Awards | Yul Brynner | Honoring his 4,525 performances in The King and I |
| 1985; 39th Tony Awards | New York State Council on the Arts | |
| 1986; 40th Tony Awards | —N/a | |
| 1987; 41st Tony Awards | George Abbott | On the occasion of his 100th birthday |
| 1987; 41st Tony Awards | Jackie Mason | His performance in The World According to Me |
| 1987; 41st Tony Awards | Robert Preston | Lawrence Langner Award (posthumously) |
| 1988; 42nd Tony Awards | Brooklyn Academy of Music | |
| 1989; 43rd Tony Awards | —N/a | |

=== 1990s ===
| Year | Recipient | Reason |
|---|---|---|
| 1990 – 1992 | —N/a | |
| 1993; 47th Tony Awards | Oklahoma! | 50th anniversary |
| 1994; 48th Tony Awards | Hume Cronyn and Jessica Tandy | Lifetime Achievement |
| 1995; 49th Tony Awards | Carol Channing | Lifetime Achievement |
| 1995; 49th Tony Awards | National Endowment for the Arts | Tony Honor |
| 1995; 49th Tony Awards | Harvey Sabinson | Lifetime Achievement after 50 years in the theater |
| 1996; 50th Tony Awards | —N/a | |
| 1997; 51st Tony Awards | Bernard B. Jacobs | Lifetime Achievement |
| 1998; 52nd Tony Awards | Edward E. Colton | Lifetime Achievement |
| 1998; 52nd Tony Awards | Ben Edwards | Lifetime Achievement |
| 1999; 53rd Tony Awards | Uta Hagen | Lifetime Achievement |
| 1999; 53rd Tony Awards | Arthur Miller | Lifetime Achievement |
| 1999; 53rd Tony Awards | Isabelle Stevenson | Lifetime Achievement |

=== 2000s ===
| Year | Recipient | Reason |
|---|---|---|
| 2000; 54th Tony Awards | Dame Edna: The Royal Tour | Live Theatrical Presentation |
| 2000; 54th Tony Awards | T. Edward Hambleton | Lifetime Achievement |
| 2001; 55th Tony Awards | Paul Gemignani | Lifetime Achievement |
| 2002; 56th Tony Awards | Julie Harris | Lifetime Achievement in the Theatre |
| 2002; 56th Tony Awards | Robert Whitehead (theatre producer) | Lifetime Achievement in the Theatre |
| 2003; 57th Tony Awards | Cy Feuer | Lifetime Achievement in the Theatre |
| 2003; 57th Tony Awards | Russell Simmons' Def Poetry Jam on Broadway | Special Theatrical Event (Competitive) |
| 2004; 58th Tony Awards | James M. Nederlander | Lifetime Achievement in the Theatre |
| 2005; 59th Tony Awards | Edward Albee | Lifetime Achievement in the Theatre |
| 2006; 60th Tony Awards | Sarah Jones | Her performance in Bridge and Tunnel |
| 2006; 60th Tony Awards | Harold Prince | Lifetime Achievement in the Theatre |
| 2007; 61st Tony Awards | —N/a | |
| 2008; 62nd Tony Awards | Robert Russell Bennett | In recognition of his contribution to the field of orchestrations |
| 2008; 62nd Tony Awards | Stephen Sondheim | Lifetime Achievement in the Theatre |
| 2009; 63rd Tony Awards | Jerry Herman | Lifetime Achievement in the Theatre |

=== 2010s ===
| Year | Recipient | Reason |
|---|---|---|
| 2010; 64th Tony Awards | Alan Ayckbourn | Lifetime Achievement in the Theatre |
| 2010; 64th Tony Awards | Marian Seldes | Lifetime Achievement in the Theatre |
| 2011; 65th Tony Awards | Athol Fugard | Lifetime Achievement in the Theatre |
| 2011; 65th Tony Awards | Philip J. Smith | Lifetime Achievement in the Theatre |
| 2012; 66th Tony Awards | Actors' Equity Association | |
| 2012; 66th Tony Awards | Hugh Jackman | |
| 2013; 67th Tony Awards | Bernard "Bernie" Gersten | |
| 2013; 67th Tony Awards | Ming Cho Lee | |
| 2013; 67th Tony Awards | Paul Libin | |
| 2014; 68th Tony Awards | Jane Greenwood | Lifetime Achievement in the Theatre |
| 2015; 69th Tony Awards | John Cameron Mitchell | |
| 2015; 69th Tony Awards | Tommy Tune | Lifetime Achievement in the Theatre |
| 2016; 70th Tony Awards | Sheldon Harnick | Lifetime Achievement in the Theatre |
| 2016; 70th Tony Awards | Marshall W. Mason | Lifetime Achievement in the Theatre |
| 2016; 70th Tony Awards | National Endowment for the Arts | |
| 2016; 70th Tony Awards | Miles Wilkin | |
| 2017; 71st Tony Awards | James Earl Jones | Lifetime Achievement in the Theatre |
| 2018; 72nd Tony Awards | Andrew Lloyd Webber | Lifetime Achievement in the Theatre |
| 2018; 72nd Tony Awards | Chita Rivera | Lifetime Achievement in the Theatre |
| 2018; 72nd Tony Awards | John Leguizamo | |
| 2018; 72nd Tony Awards | Bruce Springsteen | |
| 2019; 73rd Tony Awards | Rosemary Harris | Lifetime Achievement in the Theatre |
| 2019; 73rd Tony Awards | Terrence McNally | Lifetime Achievement in the Theatre |
| 2019; 73rd Tony Awards | Harold Wheeler | Lifetime Achievement in the Theatre |
| 2019; 73rd Tony Awards | New York City Fire Department Engine 54, Ladder 4, Battalion 9 | |
| 2019; 73rd Tony Awards | Marin Mazzie (posthumous) | |
| 2019; 73rd Tony Awards | Jason Michael Webb | |
| 2019; 73rd Tony Awards | Sonny Tilders and Creature Technology Company | For the puppetry of the title character in King Kong |

=== 2020s ===
| Year | Recipient | Reason |
|---|---|---|
| 2020; 74th Tony Awards | Graciela Daniele | Lifetime Achievement in the Theatre |
| 2020; 74th Tony Awards | The Broadway Advocacy Coalition | |
| 2020; 74th Tony Awards | David Byrne's American Utopia | |
| 2020; 74th Tony Awards | Freestyle Love Supreme | |
| 2021; No ceremony | —N/a | |
| 2022; 75th Tony Awards | Angela Lansbury | Lifetime Achievement in the Theatre |
| 2022; 75th Tony Awards | James C. Nicola | |
| 2023; 76th Tony Awards | Joel Grey | Lifetime Achievement in the Theatre |
| 2023; 76th Tony Awards | John Kander | Lifetime Achievement in the Theatre |
| 2024; 77th Tony Awards | Jack O'Brien | Lifetime Achievement in the Theatre |
| 2024; 77th Tony Awards | George C. Wolfe | Lifetime Achievement in the Theatre |
| 2024; 77th Tony Awards | Alex Edelman | "Exemplary debut" for Just for Us |
| 2024; 77th Tony Awards | Abe Jacob | Modern theatrical sound design |
| 2024; 77th Tony Awards | Nikiya Mathis | Hair and wig design for Jaja's African Hair Braiding |
| 2025; 78th Tony Awards | Harvey Fierstein | Lifetime Achievement in the Theatre |
| 2025; 78th Tony Awards | Marco Paguia (music director, conductor/piano); David Oquendo (associate music director, guitar); Renesito Avich (tres); Gustavo Schartz (bass); Javier Días, Román Diaz, Mauricio Herrera (percussion); Jesus Ricardo (trumpet); Eddie Venegas (trombone); Hery Paz (woodwinds); and Leonardo Reyna (piano) | The musicians who make up the band of Buena Vista Social Club |
| 2025; 78th Tony Awards | Jamie Harrison, Chris Fisher, Gary Beestone, and Edward Pierce | The illusions and technical effects of Stranger Things: The First Shadow |
| 2026; 79th Tony Awards | André Bishop | Lifetime Achievement in the Theatre |
| 2026; 79th Tony Awards | Jules Fisher | Lifetime Achievement in the Theatre |
| 2026; 79th Tony Awards | James Lapine | Lifetime Achievement in the Theatre |
| 2026; 79th Tony Awards | League of Resident Theatres | |

== See also ==
- Regional Theatre Tony Award
- Tony Honors for Excellence in Theatre
- Isabelle Stevenson Award
