= Command Decision =

Command Decision may refer to:

- Command Decision (novel), a 1947 World War II novel by William Wister Haines
- Command Decision (Moon novel), in the Vatta's War science fiction series by Elizabeth Moon (2007)
- Command Decision (film), a 1948 World War II film starring Clark Gable
- Command Decision (play), a 1948 World War II play starring James Whitmore
- Command Decision, a novel by Elizabeth Moon in the Vatta's War series
- "Command Decision" (Dad's Army episode), a 1968 episode of Dad's Army
- Command Decision, a series of miniature wargames by Game Designer's Workshop
