= Sy Gomberg =

American screenwriter

Sy Gomberg (August 19, 1918 – February 11, 2001) was an American Oscar-nominated film screenwriter, producer, and activist, who taught screenwriting to University of Southern California students for over a decade.

Gomberg was born in New York City, and grew up in Newark, New Jersey. He spent World War II in the First Motion Picture Unit in Hollywood. After the war, he was a contributor to Collier's Weekly and the Saturday Evening Post. In 1951, he received an Academy Award nomination for When Willie Comes Marching Home – which was based on a story Gomberg originally wrote for Collier's. He was also nominated the same year for Best Screenplay for Summer Stock. He also created, produced and wrote the 1960s ABC legal drama The Law and Mr. Jones starring James Whitmore.

A supporter of the American Civil Liberties Union, Gomberg organized members of the film industry to march with Martin Luther King Jr., in Alabama.

In 1957 Gomberg married actress Maxine Cooper. They remained together until his death at age 82 in Brentwood, California. His wife had one son from her previous marriage; they had two daughters together.

== Screenwriting ==
=== Films ===
- When Willie Comes Marching Home (1950)
- The Toast of New Orleans (1950)
- Summer Stock (1950)
- Because You're Mine (1952)
- Bloodhounds of Broadway (1952)
- Joe Butterfly (1957)
- Kathy O' (1958)
- Step Down to Terror (1958)
- The Wild and the Innocent (1959)
- Breakout (1970)
- Three Warriors (1977)
- Bender (1979)
- High Ice (1980)
- The Ghosts of Buxley Hall (1980)

=== Television ===
- The Law and Mr. Jones (1960–1962)
- Vacation Playhouse (1964)
- Good Heavens (1976)
- The Magical World of Disney (1978, 1980)
- Small Wonder (1985)
- BraveStarr (1988)

== Producer ==
=== Films ===
- Kathy O' (1958)
- The Wild and the Innocent (1959)
- Three Warriors (1977)
- Bender (1979)
- High Ice (1980)

=== Television ===
- The Law and Mr. Jones (1960–1962)
- Accidental Family (1967–1968)
