= Conlan Carter =

American film, stage and television actor

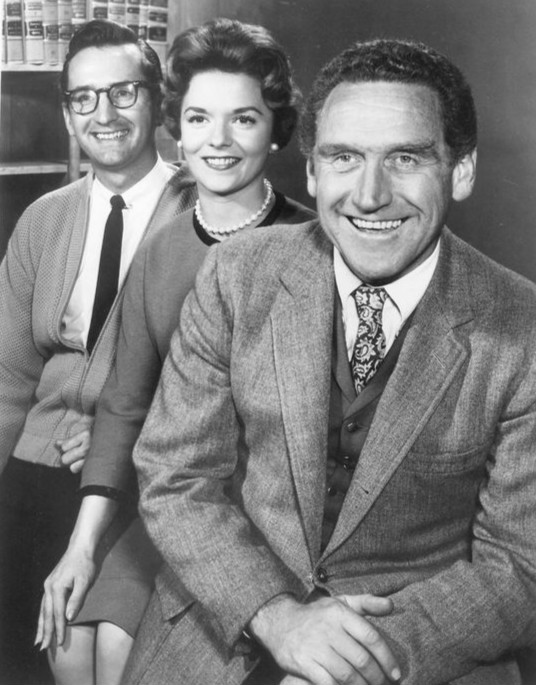
- Carter (left) with Janet De Gore and James Whitmore in The Law and Mr. Jones, 1962
- Born: Chester Conlan Carter; October 3, 1934 (age 92); Center Ridge, Arkansas, U.S.
- Education: Southeast Missouri State University
- Occupations: Film, stage and television actor
- Spouse: Patricia Musser (m. 1956)
- Children: 3
- Relatives: John Carter (brother)

Chester Conlan Carter (born October 3, 1934) is an American film, stage and television actor. He is best known for playing the Doc, the medic, in the American drama television series Combat!, for which he was nominated for a Primetime Emmy Award for Outstanding Supporting Actor in a Drama Series.

== Life and career ==
Carter was born in Center Ridge, Arkansas, and grew up on a farm. He was the brother of John Carter, an actor. He attended Matthews High School in Missouri, where he was a state champion pole vaulter. After graduating in 1952, he attended Southeast Missouri State University, on a two-year athletic scholarship.

After serving in the United States Air Force for two years, Carter attended the Bay City Actors Lab in San Francisco, California, for three years, specializing in musical theatre. He supported himself by working as a field auditor for an insurance company. He then appeared in numerous dramatic and musical productions in California. He took over the title role in an Off-Broadway production of the musical Pal Joey when the original lead actor had to leave the production because of an illness. He then began his screen career in 1960, appearing in the CBS western television series Johnny Ringo.

Later in his career, in 1960, Carter starred as law student C.E. Carruthers in the ABC legal drama television series The Law and Mr. Jones, starring along with James Whitmore and Janet De Gore. After the series ended in 1961, he played Doc, the medic, in the ABC drama television series Combat!, appearing in four seasons. For his performance in Combat!, he was nominated for a Primetime Emmy Award for Outstanding Supporting Actor in a Drama Series in 1964. He guest-starred in television programs including Gunsmoke, Rawhide, The Rifleman, The Twilight Zone, Death Valley Days, Outlaws, The Westerner and Follow the Sun. He also appeared in films such as Quick, Before It Melts, White Lightning and Dixie Dynamite.

Carter retired from acting in 1986, last appearing in the ABC action adventure television series MacGyver.
