= Bryan Sterling =

American political commentator (1922–2008)

Bryan B. Sterling (Bryan Bruno Sterling, January 27, 1922 – March 13, 2008) was an authority on the life and work of American political commentator, humorist, and entertainer Will Rogers. He scripted and co-produced "Will Rogers' USA," a one-man Broadway play about Rogers starring actor James Whitmore, created a daily syndicated newspaper column that featured timely quotations from Rogers' writings, and authored several definitive biographies of Rogers' life including a detailed examination of his death in the Point Barrow, Alaska, crash of an airplane piloted by famed aviator Wiley Post.

== Early life ==
Born Bruno Zwerling in Vienna, Austria, in 1922, Sterling and his family fled the Anschluss (Nazi occupation) in 1938 to Czechoslovakia. Bruno then flew from Prague to England on a student visa. His parents, Hermann and Katherine Zwerling later joined him in England after obtaining visas to Italy, France and England under the sponsorship of his father's brother to be a butler and cook. Bryan was relocated by the British, when they went to war in 1939, as an enemy alien interned to a prisoner of war camp in Sherbrooke in Canada. His father Hermann Zwerling was later interned at the Isle of Man, where he died of pneumonia; Bryan never saw him again. While at the camp, he shared quarters with the famous nuclear spy Klaus Fuchs. Sterling moved to Toronto after his release on November 17, 1942. There he met and (in 1949) married Frances Wingerson, who later collaborated with him on research and coauthored several of his books.

== Career ==
Born in Europe and imprisoned in Canada during World War II, Sterling never encountered Will Rogers during the humorist's lifetime. After relocating to New York City in 1948, Sterling began hearing quotations from Rogers, and was attracted to the way his wit and commentary transcended time and culture. Sometime in the early 1960s, he discovered audio recordings of radio broadcasts and speeches by Rogers, which he gained permission to publish as LP records. These were released under the private label "Distinguished Recordings." Sterling began to amass Rogers writings and memorabilia, and in 1970 co-produced and wrote much of the script for "Will Rogers' USA," a one-man Broadway play that starred actor James Whitmore. It was performed at various venues by Whitmore until 2000, and appeared on television in 1972.

In 1974, Sterling launched "Will Rogers Says," a daily column syndicated by the Des Moines Register and Tribune that matched brief quotations from Rogers' earlier writings to current political events. "When people read Will Rogers," he told Time magazine, "they realize that much of what we are going through has happened before, that we've already lived through this."

Over the following three decades, Sterling created and referred to the largest private collection of writings and information by and about Will Rogers in the United States. Rogers' son, Will Rogers, Jr., reportedly said that Sterling knew his father's writings better than anyone else. Sterling and his wife Frances traveled often from New York to the Will Rogers Memorial in Claremore, Oklahoma, and to California, to carry out research about Rogers' life, becoming close to surviving members of the Rogers family and interviewing many of the entertainment figures who worked with Rogers in Hollywood. The results of this primary research appear in Sterling's many biographies of Rogers and published compilations of his writings. The original interview tapes and notes are archived at the Will Rogers Memorial in Oklahoma.

Sterling died on March 13, 2008, in New York City, leaving behind what Will Rogers Memorial Director Steve Gragert, speaking at his funeral, described as "a collection of writings that cannot be replaced, one that anyone ... can consult with confidence and pleasure."

== Awards and honors ==
- Western Heritage Award, 1983, for A Will Rogers Treasury
- Will Rogers Communicator Award, 1997

== Books ==
- The Best of Will Rogers (1979) ISBN 0-517-53927-6
- A Will Rogers Treasury (1982) ISBN 0-517-54576-4
- Will Rogers in Hollywood (1984) ISBN 0-517-55264-7
- Will Rogers' World (1989) ISBN 0-87131-564-5
- Will Rogers & Wiley Post: Death at Barrow (1993) ISBN 0-87131-725-7
- Will Rogers Speaks (1995) ISBN 0-87131-771-0
- Will Rogers: A Photobiography (1999) ISBN 0-87833-249-9
- Forgotten Eagle: Wiley Post, America's Forgotten Aviation Pioneer (2001) ISBN 0-7867-0894-8
- The Wit & Wisdom of Will Rogers (2009; posthumous) ISBN 978-1-4351-0515-7
