= Robert Merriman =

Robert Merriman may refer to:

- Robert Hale Merriman (1908–1938), American in the Spanish Civil War
- Robert E. Merriman (1916–1983), American actor
