= Beyond Glory =

1948 film by John Farrow

- Theatrical release poster
- Directed by: John Farrow
- Screenplay by: William Wister Haines; Jonathan Latimer; Charles Marquis Warren
- Produced by: Robert Fellows
- Starring: Alan Ladd; Donna Reed
- Cinematography: John F. Seitz
- Edited by: Eda Warren
- Music by: Victor Young
- Production company: Paramount Pictures
- Distributed by: Paramount Pictures
- Release date: August 3, 1948 (United States)
- Running time: 82 minutes
- Country: United States
- Language: English
- Box office: $2.4 million (US rentals)

Beyond Glory is a 1948 American drama film directed by John Farrow and starring Alan Ladd and Donna Reed. Written by William Wister Haines, Jonathan Latimer, and Charles Marquis Warren, the film is about a former soldier who thinks he may have caused the death of his commanding officer in Tunisia. After visiting the officer's widow, they fall in love, and she encourages him to attend the United States Military Academy at West Point.

World War II hero Audie Murphy made his film debut in the small role of Ladd's academy roommate, Cadet Thomas.

== Plot ==
West Point cadet Rockwell "Rocky" Gilman is called before a hearing brought after an influential cadet, Raymond Denmore Jr., is forced to leave the academy. Gilman has reported Denmore for lying to him during training, and in retaliation has been accused of bullying and hazing the dismissed cadet. Denmore's attorney, Lew Proctor, attacking the academy and its Honor Code system, declares that Gilman is unfit and possibly criminally liable. Gilman is confined to quarters by the academy superintendent and warned not to discuss the case with anyone. Consequently, he breaks a date with his girlfriend Ann Daniels without explanation. The hearing resumes and Gilman's classmate, Eddie Loughlin, recounts how Gilman uncomplainingly withstood the rigors of academy training, especially during his plebe year, when he was still recovering from war wounds. Gilman takes the stand and testifies about his war experiences.

Unwillingly drafted in December 1941, he learned by bitter experience that all soldiers in combat must obey their superiors unquestioningly. As a result, he applied for and completed officer candidate school. Gilman joined a unit going into combat in North Africa and became friends with both Loughlin and West Point graduate Lt. Harry Daniels. Daniels was killed in action and Gilman wounded during a battle in Tunisia, after which Gilman spent two years recovering in an Army hospital. Although awarded the Distinguished Service Cross for destroying an enemy tank during the action, Gilman turned down the medal. After his discharge from the Army, Gilman returned home to Brooklyn where he learned that his former sweetheart had married in his absence. Gilman changed numerous jobs before realizing that he cannot adjust to civilian life. On the evening of V-E Day, as the city celebrated, Gilman became depressed, feeling that people were dancing on the graves of countless soldiers, and instead went to see Daniels' family and his widow Ann.

John Craig, a nurse at the hospital where Gilman was treated, then testifies that Gilman suffers from nightmares but refuses to discuss what troubles him. When given a drug to help him reveal his feelings, Gilman disclosed that during the battle Daniels ordered Gilman's platoon to counter-attack at a specific hour but Gilman inexplicably delayed the attack for three minutes, resulting in Daniels' death. Gilman was unable to explain the delay and believes himself a coward. Called back to the stand, Gilman concedes Proctor's charge that he deliberately disobeyed orders but refuses to discuss it. Proctor demands his immediate court-martial, but the superintendent insists that Rocky be given time to consider his testimony. That night Gilman receives a note from Ann saying she is going away and breaks quarters to go to New York. Gilman tells Ann that he has decided to resign from the academy and go with her. Ann refuses to accept the decision and insists that he return to confront his accusers. The next day, Gilman's adoptive father, Pop Dewing, brings three witnesses to the hearing to support his son.

The first, Ann, recalls that when she first met him on V-E day, Gilman shocked her with a confession that he caused her husband's death. Realizing that he is tortured by misplaced guilt, she took him to a West Point ceremony commemorating Daniels' death. Ann realized that she has feelings for Gilman and was told by her mother-in-law that in his last letter, Harry said that if he should be killed, he wanted Ann to have a normal life. Encouraged by Ann, Gilman was admitted to West Point as a cadet, continuing to see her, but she remained unsure if he ever intended to marry her. When he cancelled their date, Ann intended to break off their relationship until he told her of his decision to resign. The next witness, the Army physician who administered the therapeutic drug, testifies that after reviewing Gilman's medical records, he realizes that there is a gap in his memory of the battle. Finally a soldier from Gilman's platoon testifies that while Gilman was leading the unit to make the counterattack, it was ambushed by a German tank concealed in a grove. Gilman was knocked unconscious by an explosion and when he recovered shortly after, was unaware that he was ever unconscious. Gilman was mortified to discover that the specified time of attack had passed and that Daniels had been killed, but because he refused to discuss the incident, he never learned about the concussion that created the delay. Hearing the testimony, Gilman's accuser admits that he lied about Gilman's conduct during training, and the hearing is closed. Later, General Dwight D. Eisenhower speaks at the West Point graduation, with Gilman among the proud graduates.

== Cast ==
- Alan Ladd as Cadet "Rocky" Gilman
- Donna Reed as Ann Daniels
- George Macready as Major General Bond
- George Coulouris as Lew Proctor
- Harold Vermilyea as Raymond Denmore Sr.
- Henry Travers as Pop Dewing
- Tom Neal as Captain Harry Daniels
- Conrad Janis as Raymond Denmore Jr.
- Dick Hogan as Cadet Sgt. Eddie Loughlin
- Paul Lees as Miller
- Audie Murphy as Thomas
- Geraldine Wall as Mrs. Daniels
- Louis Van Rooten as Dr. White

== Production ==
The movie was originally known as The Long Gray Line, a reference to the unbroken line of officers produced by West Point over the years. Paramount assigned William Wister Haines to write the script in March 1947 and he went to West Point for research. Producer Robert Fellows met with West Point's superintendent, General Maxwell D. Taylor, who promised co-operation. Fellows and Haines shot documentary footage at West Point in June. The same month it was announced the film's leads would be Alan Ladd and Joan Caulfield. Caulfield's casting meant she had to be replaced on Night Has a Thousand Eyes by Gail Russell. John Farrow assigned to direct in August.

The same month Audie Murphy was cast. He had been under contract to James and William Cagney for a year and a half but they had never used him in a film. His appearance in the film was technically a "loan out" but Murphy received all his fee for this film.

The film was made with the co operation of West Point. Filming started on location at West Point in early September 1947. That week, Joan Caulfield was replaced by Donna Reed, who had to be borrowed from MGM.

Gerald J Higgins acted as technical adviser.

In November 1947 the film was re-titled Now and Forever. The following March it became Beyond Glory.

== Reception ==
The reviewer in The New York Times called the film "a manful effort to extol the martial virtues and to defend the Academy against its detractors." The reviewer continues:

Ladd's performance is unrelievedly granite-jawed, but under the influence of Academy discipline, the granite is highly polished. Donna Reed, his leading woman, is creditably restrained in her depiction of a war widow. Coulouris' attack on Ladd and West Point is so unnecessarily malignant that one might almost suspect him of being an Annapolis man. As director, John Farrow has sometimes underlined the emotional content of the scenario unduly, but his technique of integrating flash-backs and present action is masterfully smooth.
