= John Carter (actor) =

American actor

- Carter was known for his role as Vic Phillips in the 1983 film Scarface and played Stephen F. Austin in 1969 on Death Valley Days.
- Born: November 26, 1927; Center Ridge; Conway County; Arkansas, U.S
- Died: May 23, 2015 (aged 87); New York City, U.S
- Occupation: Actor
- Years active: 1967–2006
- Spouse(s): Barbara Williams (married 1955-1966, divorced) (1 child); Kendall T. Fewel (married 1993-2015, his death)
- Relatives: Conlan Carter (brother)

John Carter (November 26, 1927 – May 23, 2015) was an American actor known for the films Badlands (1973), Scarface (1983), and The Hoax (2006). He may be best remembered for his recurring role as Police Lieutenant John Biddle on the television series Barnaby Jones (1973-1980). (Before that, he had played a different character, a homicide victim, in an early episode of the series.) He also directed two Barnaby Jones episodes.

== Biography ==
Born in Center Ridge in Conway County in central Arkansas, Carter was the older brother of actor Conlan Carter of the ABC television series, Combat!. John Carter had his first TV role in that series, playing a major in the fifth-season episode "Nightmare on the Red Ball Run". In 1967, he was part of an extensive cast in the TV Western Gunsmoke as Doyle in "Ladies From St. Louis" (S12E27).

Carter played an historical figure, Stephen F. Austin, in the 1969 episode "Here Stands Bailey" of the syndicated series Death Valley Days.

Carter died from pneumonia on May 23, 2015, at the age of 87.

== Filmography ==
Year	Title	Role	Notes
1969	The Thousand Plane Raid	Middleton	
1969	Marooned	Flight Surgeon	
1970	Monte Walsh	Farmer	
1971	The Andromeda Strain	MP Capt. Morton	
1971	The Love Machine	Reporter	Uncredited
1972	Joe Kidd	Judge	
1973	The Doll Squad	Sen. Stockwell	
1973	Badlands	Rich Man	
1977	Telefon	Stroller	
1983	Scarface	Vic Phillips	
1985	My Science Project	General	
1989	The Runnin' Kind	Richard Curtis	
1989	Worth Winning	Mr. Cooper	
1995	Savage Hearts	Bernie	
1998	Celebrity	Father Gladden	
1999	Random Hearts	Peyton's Father	
1999	Swimming on the Moon	Thomas Hatch	
2006	The Hoax	Harold McGraw	(final film role)
