= Harvey Sabinson =

American theatrical press agent (1924–2020)

Harvey Sabinson (October 24, 1924, in Queens, New York – April 19, 2020, in Sarasota, Florida) was an American theatrical press agent and the executive director of the Broadway League.

Sabinson graduated from Townsend Harris High School in Queens and went on to Queens College, but entered the Army for World War II before graduating; he received a Purple Heart. Harvey's older brother Lee (1911-1991) had meanwhile become a Broadway producer. On Harvey's return from the service, he worked initially as an assistant to his brother's press agent, and decided to pursue that as a career. Over a career of 30 years he promoted hits such as Neil Simon's The Odd Couple, Hello, Dolly!, and 1776, as well as doing publicity for stars such as Carol Channing, Barbra Streisand, Jason Robards, and others.

In 1973 Sabinson, suffering from anxiety, took some time off and wrote a memoir, "Darling, You Were Wonderful", which was published in 1977.

In 1976 Sabinson retired as an agent. He next went to work for the League of New York Theatres and Producers, now called the Broadway League. He became the executive director of the League, from 1982 to 1995.

Sabinson helped establish the theater administration department at the Yale School of Drama in 1965. He also served on the board of theater-related non-profits: the American Academy of Dramatic Arts, the Actors Fund of America, and the Association of Theatrical Press Agents and Managers.

== Recognition ==
Sabinson was awarded a Special Tony Award for Lifetime Achievement in 1995 in recognition of his fifty year career of contributions to the theater. In 1998 he was made a Fellow of the College of Fellows of the American Theatre, and received a Founder's Award from the American Theater Hall of Fame.
