= Three Warriors =

- Theatrical release poster
- Directed by: Kieth Merrill
- Written by: Sy Gomberg
- Produced by: Sy Gomberg; Saul Zaentz
- Starring: Charles White-Eagle; McKee Redwing; Lois Red Elk; Randy Quaid; Christopher Lloyd; Trey Wilson
- Cinematography: Bruce Surtees
- Edited by: Bonnie Koehler
- Music by: Merrill B. Jenson
- Production company: Fantasy Films
- Distributed by: United Artists
- Release dates: October 1977 (Chicago International Film Festival); February 1978 (U.S.)
- Running time: 100 minutes
- Country: United States
- Language: English

Three Warriors is a 1977 American drama film directed by Kieth Merrill, written by Sy Gomberg, and starring Charles White-Eagle, McKee Redwing, Lois Red Elk, Randy Quaid, Christopher Lloyd and Trey Wilson. It premiered at the Chicago International Film Festival in October 1977 and was released in February 1978 by United Artists.

== Cast ==
- Charles White-Eagle as Grandfather
- McKee Redwing as Michael
- Lois Red Elk as Mother
- Randy Quaid as Ranger Quentin Hammond
- Christopher Lloyd as Steve Chaffey
- Trey Wilson as Chuck
- Michael Huddleston as Pat
- Raydine Spino as Older Sister
- Stacey Leonard as Younger Sister
- Mel Lambert as Horsedealer
- Dean Brooks as Officer at Fair
- Byron Patt as Michael's Father
- Lynn Miller as Slaughterhouse Supervisor
- Nathan Jim Sr. as Mechanic
- Avex Miller Sr. as Mechanic's Father
- Harold Cedartree as Singer
