= Slim (film) =

1937 film by Ray Enright

- Directed by: Ray Enright
- Written by: William Wister Hain
- Based on: Slim by William Wister Haines
- Produced by: Samuel Bischoff
- Starring: Pat O'Brien; Henry Fonda; Margaret Lindsay
- Cinematography: Sidney Hickox
- Edited by: Owen Marks
- Music by: Max Steiner
- Production company: Warner Bros. Pictures
- Distributed by: Warner Bros. Pictures
- Release date: June 23, 1937 (New York City)
- Running time: 85 minutes
- Country: United States
- Language: English

Slim is a 1937 American romantic drama film directed by Ray Enright and starring Pat O'Brien, Henry Fonda and Margaret Lindsay. It is sometimes (incorrectly) called Slim the Lineman. The picture is a film adaptation of the 1934 novel Slim by William Wister Haines, which concerns linemen in the electric power industry. The supporting cast features Jane Wyman.

== Plot ==
Slim, a farmer from southeastern Ohio, becomes fascinated by a crew of linemen erecting transmission towers across his uncle and aunt's property. He asks Pop for a job, but there are no openings. When a man is fired, however, Red, Pop's best lineman, takes a liking to Slim and persuades Pop to give him a chance as a "grunt", an assistant on the ground who sends up tools and parts. Red and Stumpy, another grunt, teach Slim what he needs to know.

Slim wins the respect of Red and Pop when he spots cheating during a poker game and pitches in during the ensuing brawl. When hungover lineman Wyatt Ranstead falls and is killed, Slim is promoted to lineman. The company sends a vice president to investigate the death. To save Pop's job, Red deliberately antagonizes the executive and is fired. Slim gets himself dismissed out of loyalty, and the two go on the road.

They head to Chicago to see Red's girlfriend, Cally, a nurse. The three set out to have a good time (although Red insists on paying for everything). Slim finds himself falling for Cally, and she for him. When Red's money runs out, he and Slim head off to New Mexico for work.

Red knows and dislikes one of their fellow linemen, Wilcox. When Red is later offered the job of foreman at another camp, he initially turns it down, but changes his mind when Slim offers to be his "straw boss" (assistant). Wilcox, who had been hoping for the promotion himself, tries to sabotage Red's rope, but Slim stops him. Later, on the ground, Wilcox pulls out a knife and stabs Slim. While Slim is recovering in the hospital, Cally comes to nurse him. They admit they love each other and tell Red they are going to get married. When Slim is offered stable, safe maintenance work, Cally accepts for him. Slim, however, refuses to give up his dangerous profession, and when Pop sends for Red, goes with him.

They arrive during a terrible blizzard and are called out to a substation to restore power, even though there are "hot" wires all around. Red and another man fall to their deaths when a rope breaks in a block and tackle while pulling up a transmission line. Cally joins Slim and once again tries to talk him out of line work. When Slim heads back out into the snow to complete the job, Cally accepts his decision, telling him, "I'll be waiting for you".

== Cast ==
- Pat O'Brien as Red Blayd
- Henry Fonda as Slim
- Margaret Lindsay as Cally
- Stuart Erwin as Stumpy
- J. Farrell MacDonald as Pop
- Dick Purcell as Tom
- Joe Sawyer as Wilcox (as Joseph Sawyer)
- Craig Reynolds as Gambler
- John Litel as Wyatt Ranstead
- Jane Wyman as Stumpy's Girl
- Harland Tucker as Lafe Garrettson (as Harlan Tucker)
- Joe King as Steve (as Joseph King)
- Carlyle Moore Jr. as Al
- Archie Robbins as Joe (as James Robbins)
- Henry Otho as Mitch
- Dick Wessel as Ed (as Dick Wessell)
- Max Wagner as Griff
- Ben Hendricks Jr. as Kelly (as Ben Hendricks)
- Alonzo Price as Gambler
- Maidel Turner as Mrs. Johnson
- Walter Miller as Sam

== Reception ==
TV Guide described the film thusly: "While no great shakes as high drama, SLIM is a well-crafted buddy picture, which offers a detailed look at an occupation little seen in movies. ... SLIM was Fonda's first film for Warner Bros. and his talents complemented O'Brien's perfectly."

== See also ==
- Manpower, a 1941 film also about linemen in a romantic triangle starring Edward G. Robinson, Marlene Dietrich and George Raft.
