= Tony Award for Best Newcomer =

American theatre award for Broadway

- Awarded for: Best Newcomer
- Location: United States New York City
- Presented by: American Theatre Wing, The Broadway League
- Currently held by: June Lockhart for For Love or Money; James Whitmore for Command Decision (1948)
- Website: TonyAwards.com

The Tony Award for Best Newcomer was an honor presented at the Tony Awards, a ceremony established in 1947 as the Antoinette Perry Awards for Excellence in Theatre. The award was given to actors and actresses for quality debut roles in a Broadway play or musical. It was presented only once, to two performers, in 1948.

== Winners and nominees ==
indicates the winner

=== 1940s ===
Year	Performer	Production	Character
1948; 2nd Tony Awards
1948; 2nd Tony Awards	June Lockhart	For Love or Money	Janet Blake
1948; 2nd Tony Awards	James Whitmore	Command Decision	Tech Sergeant Harold Evans

== See also ==
- Laurence Olivier Award for Best Newcomer in a Play
- List of Tony Award-nominated productions
