= Command Decision (film) =

1948 film by Sam Wood

- theatrical Poster
- Directed by: Sam Wood
- Written by: George Froeschel; William R. Laidlaw
- Based on: Command Decision; 1947 play by William Wister Haines
- Produced by: Sidney Franklin; Gottfried Reinhardt
- Starring: Clark Gable; Walter Pidgeon; Van Johnson; Brian Donlevy
- Cinematography: Harold Rosson
- Edited by: Harold F. Kress
- Music by: Miklós Rózsa
- Production company: Metro-Goldwyn-Mayer
- Distributed by: Metro-Goldwyn-Mayer
- Release date: February 1949
- Running time: 112 minutes
- Country: United States
- Language: English
- Budget: $2.4 million
- Box office: $3.6 million

Command Decision is a 1949 war film released by Metro-Goldwyn-Mayer starring Clark Gable, Walter Pidgeon, Van Johnson, and Brian Donlevy, and directed by Sam Wood, based on the 1948 stage play of the same name written by William Wister Haines, which he based on his best-selling 1947 novel. The screenplay for the film was written by George Froeschel and William R. Laidlaw. (Note: Laidlaw, a reserve colonel in the Air Force, had been a public relations officer with the Eighth Air Force in England. He went on to assist General Henry H. Arnold in writing his memoirs, Global Mission, in 1949.) Haines' play ran on Broadway for almost a year beginning in October 1947.

Although portraying the strategic bombing of Nazi Germany in World War II, the main action takes place almost entirely within the confines of the headquarters of its protagonist. Depicting the political infighting of conducting a major war effort, the film's major theme is the emotional toll on commanders from ordering missions that result in high casualties, the effects of sustained combat on all concerned, and the nature of accountability for its consequences.

== Plot ==
In 1943, at the English Ministry of Information, war correspondents Elmer Brockhurst and James Carwood attend the daily bombing mission briefings. The RAF representative announces light losses, but the public relations office of the Eighth Air Force reports record casualties. Carwood asks if any target is worth such losses, and Brockhurst suggests the U.S. commander, Brigadier-General Dennis, loves the war. Brockhurst travels to Dennis' headquarters, and observes B-17 Flying Fortresses taking off on a strike. He asks Technical Sergeant Evans, who looks after Dennis and his office, about the arrest of a high profile strike leader named Captain Jenks but gets no response.

Dennis is seeking to press the attack against critical German industrial facilities, no matter the US losses. One day into a three day operation his boss is back from the States and he has multiple new troubles on his hands. Major-General Kane brings along Brigadier-General Clifton Garnet, a West Point classmate of Dennis and brother-in-law of Dennis' flight commander Colonel Ted Martin. There is speculation Garnet was sent by the Pentagon to replace either Kane or Dennis. Additionally, a visiting Congressional Military Affairs Committee delegation is due, and Kane and Garnet plead for low loss missions because an imminent interservice resource allocation conference at the Pentagon might curtail getting more bombers.

Dennis and Brockhurst are old antagonists and clash again over the role of the press. Kane tries to keep the peace, but when Dennis identifies the targets as Posenleben and Schweinhafen, Kane realizes Dennis has begun the highly sensitive Operation Stitch in his absence. Dennis' bombers suffer even heavier heavy losses on the second day's strike and Brockhurst refuses to participate in a cover-up. Martin reports that the group attacked the wrong target, a torpedo factory, and both Kane and Garnet see an opportunity to promote the mistake as critical cooperation with the U.S. Navy. Brockhurst flares over the blunder, but to gain his cooperation Kane entrusts him with the top secret information that Stitch seeks to destroy factories building a balance-altering German jet fighter (Note: The Messerschmitt Me 262 is called the Lantze-Wolf fighter.) before it can go into service, destroy US air superiority, and ruin American strategic daylight bombing. An attack on third city, Fendelhorst, will complete Stitch. A brief stretch of continued clear weather promises the opportunity to do so before the Luftwaffe can mount an impenetrable jet defense.

Security demands the Congressmen be kept in the dark on Stich, and thus the reason for the horrible casualties in both planes and crews. Kane rules against attacking Schweinhafen again but Dennis blackmails him by threatening to press charges against insubordinate Captain Jenks, who had refused to fly that day's mission to Schweinhafen and whose uncle is Congressman Malcolm of the visiting VIP delegation. Kane extorts that in turn Kane will release Jenks from confinement and award him a medal during Malcolm's visit.

While Kane wines and dines the Committee, Garnet offers Martin a promotion to chief of staff in a B-29 Superfortress command in the Pacific.

The mission is barely airborn the next morning before Malcolm accosts Dennis for being cavalier about losses. Vicious bickering follows between him and Dennis and Dennis and Kane. Colonel Martin sends the signal that Schweinhafen has been destroyed, but during Jenks' decoration ceremony Dennis is told Martin's B-17 (with Jenks' crew) is shot down and Martin killed. Malcolm renews his tirade against Dennis. Revolted, Jenks tells his uncle to shut up and refuses his medal.

Dennis, emotionally shaken by Martin's death, excuses himself to plan the next mission. Kane is shocked to learn that despite everything, Dennis plans hit Fendelhorst - and create a fourth day of horrific losses, potentially enough to undermine daylight strategic bombing and a career's work advancing airpower. Kane relieves Dennis of command and replaces him with Garnet. When Garnet lines up an easy mission for the next day, he comes to the realization that bitter as it had been for him, Dennis had been doing the right thing. He makes the command decision to attack Fendelhorst.

Before Dennis can depart his orders stateside are changed, and he is given the new B-29 command. Dennis and Garnet bid an amicable goodbye, and Brockhurst wishes him well as he boards his aircraft.

== Cast ==
- Clark Gable as Brig. Gen. K.C. "Casey" Dennis
- Walter Pidgeon as Maj. Gen. Roland Goodlaw Kane (Note: As appearing in the credits. Kane is never referenced as other than "General Kane". A line of dialogue, "I know what the boys call me", alludes to a derisive nickname that is not revealed.)
- Van Johnson as T/Sgt. Immanuel T. Evans (Note: The character of Evans was "Harold Evans" in the other versions.)
- Brian Donlevy as Brig. Gen. Clifton I. Garnet
- Charles Bickford as Elmer Brockhurst
- John Hodiak as Col. Edward Rayton "Ted" Martin
- Edward Arnold as Congressman Arthur Malcolm
- Marshall Thompson as Capt. George Washington Bellpepper Lee (Note: "Culpepper" in the play became "Bellpepper" in the film. The scene with his character did not appear at all in the novel.)
- Richard Quine as Maj. George Rockton
- Cameron Mitchell as Lt. Ansel Goldberg
- Clinton Sundberg as Maj. Homer V. Prescott
- Ray Collins as Maj. Desmond Lansing
- Warner Anderson as Col. Earnest Haley
- John McIntire as Maj. Belding Davis
- Moroni Olsen as Congressman Stone
- John Ridgely as James Carwood
- Michael Steele as Capt. Lucius Jenks (Note: Jenks' relationship to Malcolm was altered from that of constituent in the play to nephew in the novel and film.)
- Edward Earle as Congressman Watson
- Mack Williams as Lt. Col. Virgil Jackson
- James Millican as Maj. Garrett Davenport

== Production ==
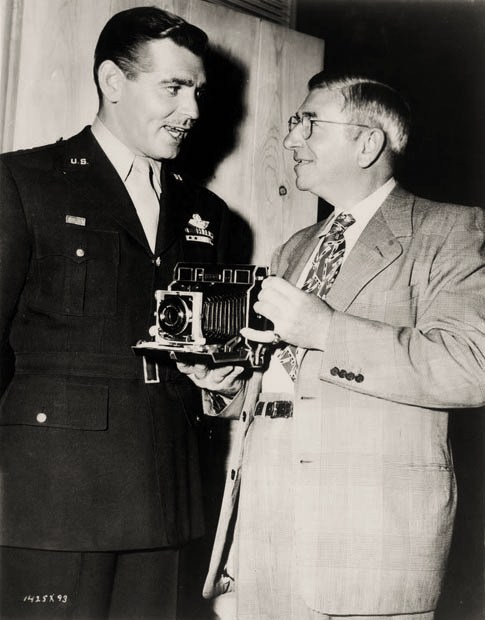
Publicity shot of Clark Gable with the head of the camera department John Arnold.

Clark Gable joined the Army Air Forces during World War II shortly after the death of his wife Carole Lombard in an aircraft crash following a bond drive. He was promoted from lieutenant to major and flew five combat bombing missions from England in B-17s as a waist gunner, receiving the Distinguished Flying Cross and the Air Medal. Cameron Mitchell, who plays bombardier Lt. Goldberg, was also a bombardier during the war.

On the basis of his stage performance as Technical Sergeant Evans in the Broadway production of Command Decision, James Whitmore was contracted to MGM, although Van Johnson played the role in the film. (Note: Whitmore would make his mark in another MGM World War II film released just a year later, Battleground, which also featured Johnson.) Barry Nelson provided the uncredited radio voice ("Cumquat B-Baker") of B-17 pilot bringing in his bomber after a raid with wounded aboard.

MGM bought the rights to William Wister Haines' 1947 novel Command Decision at the behest of Gable, who saw in it a starring role for himself. MGM paid a $100,000 down payment, which would escalate to $300,000 if the novel were staged as a play by October 1947. Beating the dealine and cashing in on the rider, the play opened on Broadway on October 1 of that year.

Before filming began, Robert Taylor and Tom Drake had been expected to play roles in the film. Command Decision was in production from April 13–June 23, 1948, although principal photography began on April 24, 1948 at March Air Force Base. A single location shot was included in the final print, in which Dennis sees Martin off on the fatal mission. Two privately owned B-17s were used, and the scene was shot at San Fernando Valley Airport in Van Nuys, California.

The film uses extensive cuts of archived footage shot during the war, but all of it is of the many varied aspects of mission preparation, takeoffs and landings. Except for the sequence under the opening credits, of bomber formations leaving voluminous contrails and then dropping bombs, no combat footage is used in the movie. Only two exteriors were used, of Brockhurst driving up to the main gate of the base in a jeep, and of Martin saying farewell to Dennis at his bomber's dispersal hardstand, totalling little more than a minute of film. The film's only action scene involves closeups of Dennis "talking down" a bomber piloted by a bombardier.

Director Sam Wood acknowledged the limitations of filming a stage play, shooting all scenes from a "relentlessly ground level", and used master shots and single-camera group shots that allowed the actors to use the choreography of the theatrical play to establish dramatic and moral relationships.

No version of the story, including the novel, clearly establishes the identity or nature of Kane's command, but in the novel Kane's personal characteristics, history, and notoriety coincide with those of Eighth Air Force commander Ira C. Eaker.

== Release ==
The premiere of Command Decision took place in Los Angeles on December 25, 1948, and the film went into general release in February 1949. The premiere in Washington D.C., which took place sometime in February, was attended by Vice President Alben W. Barkley, Secretary of State Dean Acheson, U.S. Air Force Chief of Staff General Hoyt S. Vandenberg and other dignitaries.

=== Box office ===
Command Decision was successful at the box office in 1949 earning $2,901,000 in the US and Canada and $784,000 elsewhere. However, due to its expensive cast, MGM recorded a loss of $130,000 on the movie.

== Critical reception ==
Command Decision received positive reviews and was named as one of the ten best films of 1948 by The New York Times and by Film Daily. Critical review centered on the key dramatic elements of the film, especially concerning the human factors involved in making command decisions. Bosley Crowther noted: "... it is the performance of Clark Gable in this scene of a soldier's momentary grieving that tests his competence in the leading role. For this is not only the least likely but it is the most sentimental moment in the film, and the fact that Mr. Gable takes it with dignity and restraint bespeaks his worth. Otherwise, he makes of General Dennis a smart, tough, straight-shooting man, disciplinary yet human and a "right guy" to have in command."

Although no such claim was made in the film, the Los Angeles Times reported in August 1949 that a syndicated British film reviewer was offended that it appeared to him to give the audience the idea that American precision bombing had won the war.

Screenwriters William Laidlaw and George Froeschel were nominated for two Writers Guild Awards, for "Best Written American Drama" and the Robert Meltzer Award for the "Screenplay Dealing Most Ably with Problems of the American Scene".

== Adaptation ==
On March 3, 1949, Clark Gable, Van Johnson, Walter Pidgeon, Brian Donlevy, John Hodiak, Edward Arnold and Richard Quine reprised their film roles in a 30-minute radio version of Command Decision for the NBC radio network program Screen Guild Theater, the first pre-recorded commercial show to be broadcast over the network from Hollywood.

== Home media ==
Command Decision was released on DVD on June 5, 2007 in the United States.
