= Will Rogers' USA =

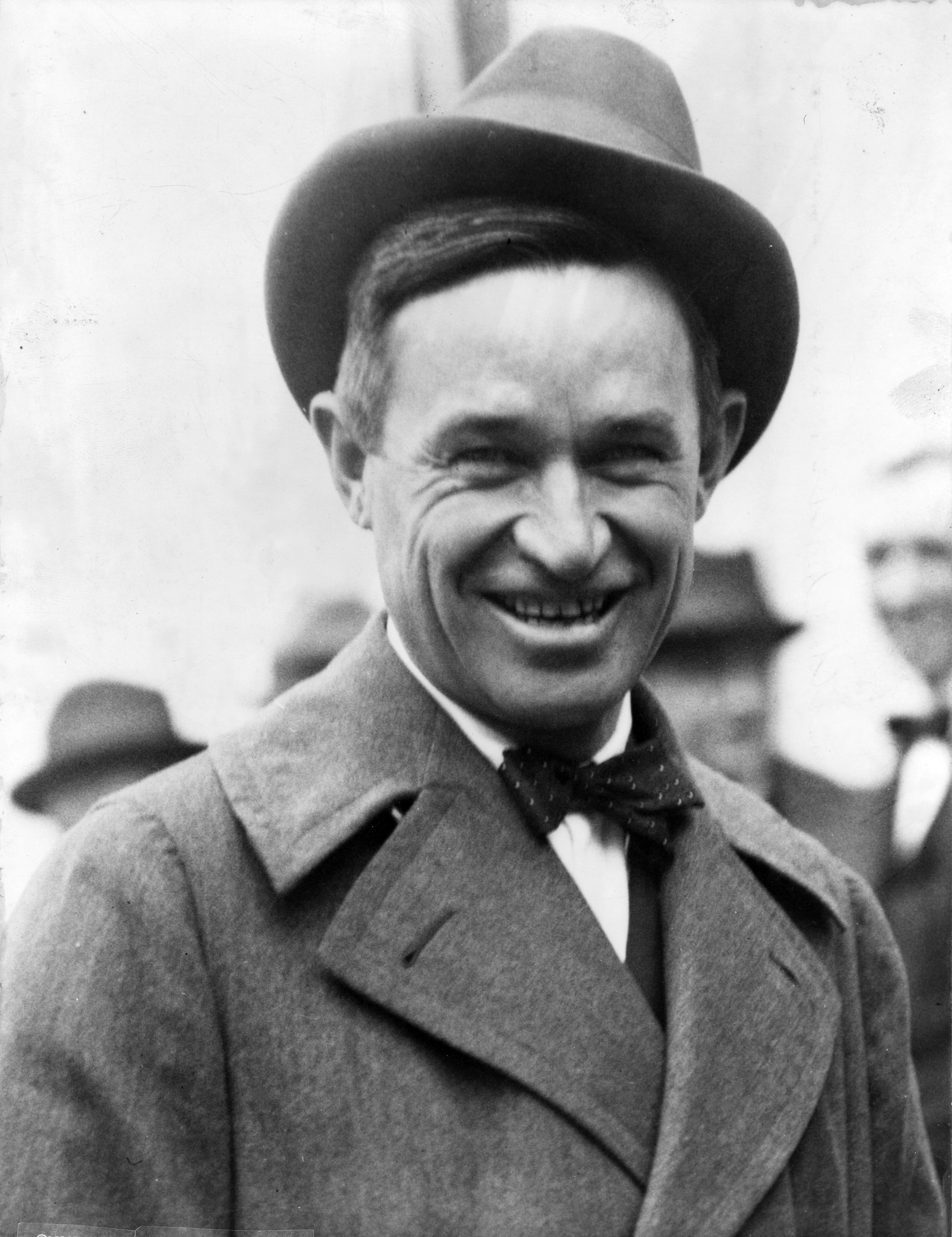
Will Rogers

Will Rogers' USA is a one-man play about humorist Will Rogers that James Whitmore appeared in for more than 30 years. It was first staged by Frankie Hewitt at the Loretto-Hilton Theater in Webster Groves, Missouri in January 1970 and then at Ford's Theatre in September 1970. It was broadcast on television and recorded on record in 1972 and had a limited run on Broadway in May 1974. The Broadway production was produced by George Spota. The play was produced and conceived by George Spota, adapted and directed by Paul Shyre, with research by associate producer Bryan Sterling. Whitmore changed his monologue each time he performed it, using actual quotations from Will Rogers to comment on current events at the time of the performance.

Gene McFall was reportedly the first person other than Whitmore to perform in the play in 1982. He was stage manager and understudy to Whitmore while on tour in 1983 and 1984. Another source says that actor Paul Tripp starred in a national tour of the play in 1974.

Whitmore reprised the role numerous times through February 2000, when he performed it for the eighth and final run at Ford's Theatre in Washington, D.C. His costume was later sent to the Smithsonian Institution.
