= George Pierce (backstage doorman) =

American backstage doorman

- Occupation: Backstage doorman

George Pierce was an American backstage doorman. He received the Special Tony Award at the 2nd Tony Awards.
