= William Wister Haines =

American screenwriter

- Born: September 17, 1908; Des Moines, Iowa, U.S.
- Died: November 18, 1989 (aged 81); Acapulco, Mexico
- Resting place: Oak Hill Cemetery; Washington, D.C., U.S.
- Occupations: novelist; screenwriter; playwright

William Wister Haines (September 17, 1908 – November 18, 1989) was an American author, screenwriter, and playwright. His most notable work, Command Decision, was published as a novel, play, and screenplay following World War II.

== Personal history ==
Haines was born in Des Moines, Iowa, in 1908, one of three sons of Diedrich Jansen Haines and Ella Wister Haines. His father, the grandson of Reuben Haines III, worked as vice president of a surety bond company, Southern Surety Company of Iowa, and his mother was a notable author of mysteries and serialized stories, many of which appeared in The Des Moines Register. His uncle, Owen Wister, authored the 1902 novel The Virginian, which popularized the genre of Western fiction, and later became both a successful film and television series.

Haines was educated at the Scholta-Nollen School, the Culver Military Academy, and Des Moines' Theodore Roosevelt High School, from which he graduated in 1926. He attended the University of Pennsylvania, graduating in 1931 with a degree in engineering. Unable to find employment as an engineer during the Great Depression, he worked nights as an electric lineman on the Pennsylvania Railroad running between Chicago and the Eastern Seaboard. His experience as a lineman became the basis for his first two books, Slim and High Tension.

Haines joined the United States Army Air Forces in early 1942, going to the United Kingdom as an intelligence officer with the U.S. Eighth Air Force. Haines served nearly three years in Britain, rising to the rank of lieutenant colonel on the staff of the U.S. Strategic Air Forces Europe, where he worked on the Ultra Project.

In 1934, Haines married Frances Tuckerman and had two children, William Jr. and Laura. Haines retired in Laguna Niguel, in Southern California.

Haines died on November 18, 1989, of a stroke while on a cruise ship near Acapulco. He was buried at Oak Hill Cemetery in Washington, D.C.

== Works ==
Slim, published in 1934, won him critical and popular acclaim as a writer. The novel was part adventure tale, part social commentary, and part-time capsule of the Great Depression, notable for its realism and its on-target portrayal of working class attitudes and language during that period. Slim continues to have an audience today and is a sought-after book, especially among utility linemen and railfans. In 1937, the novel was made into the movie Slim starring Henry Fonda, with Haines writing the screenplay. The illustrations for the hardcover of Slim were by Robert Lawson and do not appear in the paperback releases.

His next novel, High Tension (1938), was a critical success but less successful financially. His novel The Winter War (1961), about the 1877 winter campaign of the U.S. Army against the Sioux in Montana, was at the time of its publication a popular western and was awarded the Spur Award of the Western Writers of America. He also published a non-fiction book, Ultra in 1980, also based on his World War II experiences as an intelligence officer. His other books were The Honorable Rocky Slade (1955), Target (1964), and The Image (1968).

His filmography credits are Alibi Ike (1935), Man of Iron (1935), Black Legion (1937), Slim (1937), Mr. Dodd Takes the Air (1937), Submarine D-1 (1937), The Texans (1938), Beyond Glory (1948), Command Decision (1948), The Racket (1951), One Minute to Zero (1952), The Eternal Sea (1955), The Wings of Eagles (1957), and Torpedo Run (1958).

Haines was a member of the Authors Guild and the Dramatists Guild of America. He also contributed various articles and stories to magazines. His short story "Remarks-None" was published in the railroad story anthology Headlights and Markers in 1968.

=== Command Decision ===
While in Europe, Haines began writing a stage play, Command Decision, based on his 8th Air Force experiences, but was unable to sell it. Many producers rejected it, feeling it followed too closely the war's end to have popular appeal. A publisher suggested he write it as a novel, which first appeared as a four-part serial in The Atlantic Monthly between October 1946 and 1947. In January 1947, the first edition of Command Decision brought Haines critical and popular acclaim. The success of the novel revived the play, which ran for 409 performances on Broadway between October 1947 and September 1948.

In May 1947 Haines reached a deal with MGM Studios to sell it the film rights for $100,000, with an additional promise of 15% of the play's weekly gross (or approximately $300,000) if the play opened by October 1947.

Command Decision as a feature film starring Clark Gable premiered in December 1948. The film and book have been called the first important work of fiction about World War II. They differ from most of the prior war-themed works from that period, which stressed the experiences of average citizens forced to go to war, in that Command Decision explores the pressures of leadership, political in-fighting, moral conflicts, and psychological effects rather than glamorizing combat, and frankly admitting the high losses in men and materiel that characterized air combat. It also takes a "warts and all" approach to the conduct of some U.S. military leaders, depicting occasional propaganda misrepresentations, personal ambitions, opportunism, and information clampdowns in the name of security. The protagonist of the story is a general who must choose between submitting to public relations demands and doing what must be done to defeat Germany. He chooses the latter and is relieved of his command for it, leading to the death of his closest friend in the process.
