= Paul Shyre =

American dramatist

Paul Shyre (March 8, 1926 – November 19, 1989) was an American director and playwright who received a Special Tony Award and won a Regional Emmy Award. He is noted for the plays Hizzoner, Will Rogers' USA and The President Is Dead.

Shyre graduated from the University of Florida and the American Academy of Dramatic Arts. He was a professor of theater arts at Cornell University.

Shyre adapted to the stage, directed and co-produced the Seán O'Casey novels, Pictures in the Hallway, I Knock at the Door and Drums Under the Windows. He also wrote and directed A Whitman Portrait and An Unpleasant Evening With H.L. Mencken.

== Awards ==
- 1957 – Drama Desk Award for Pictures in the Hallway
- 1957 – Obie Award, special citation for bringing O'Casey to Off-Broadway; for his adaptations of I Knock at the Door, Pictures in the Hallway, and USA
- 1957 – Special Tony Award
- 1987 – New York Emmy Award shared with Robert H. Rines for the television and later Broadway play Hizzoner! about Mayor Fiorello La Guardia.
