= The Law and Mr. Jones =

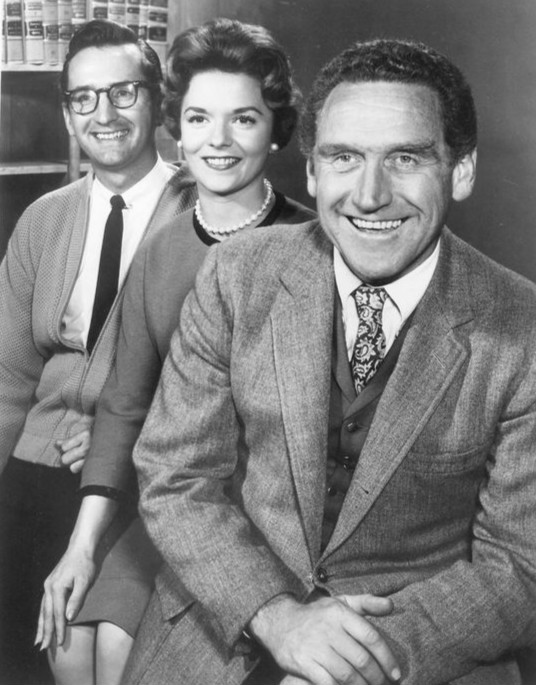
- Conlan Carter, Janet De Gore and James Whitmore (1962)
- Genre: Legal drama
- Created by: Sy Gomberg
- Written by: William Bast; Sy Gomberg; Lester Pine; Robert Pirosh
- Directed by: David Alexander; Charles F. Haas; Robert Ellis Miller
- Starring: James Whitmore; Janet De Gore; Conlan Carter
- Composer: Hans Salter
- Country of origin: United States
- Original language: English
- No. of seasons: 2
- No. of episodes: 45

Production
- Producer: Sy Gomberg
- Production companies: Naxan Productions; Four Star Television

Original release
- Network: ABC
- Release: October 7, 1960 – July 12, 1962

The Law and Mr. Jones is an American legal drama series starring James Whitmore. The series aired on ABC in two nonconsecutive seasons from October 7, 1960 to June 2, 1961, and again from April 19 to July 12, 1962. The program was created and produced by Sy Gomberg, and was set in New York City.

== Cast ==
=== Main ===
- James Whitmore as Abraham Lincoln Jones
- Janet De Gore as Marsha Spear
- Conlan Carter as C.E. Carruthers

=== Recurring ===
- Russ Brown as Thomas Jones, father of Abraham Lincoln Jones

=== Guest stars ===
Notable guest stars include:

- J. Pat O'Malley, a character actor, in "What's in a Name?"
- Frank Silvera as Garcia in "Music to Hurt By"
- Parley Baer, noted character actor, in "Drivel"
- Beverly Washburn, who starred with Loretta Young and in the 1957 western film Old Yeller, as Sue in "A Question of Guilt"
- Barbara Bain, later of Mission: Impossible, as D.J. in "Christmas Is a Legal Holiday"
- Nancy Marchand, later the publisher on Lou Grant, as Dorothy in "The Long Echo"
- William Fawcett in "The Great Gambling Raid"
- Norman Fell, also on 87th Precinct, as Fred Cook in the episode "Lethal Weapons"
- Eduard Franz as Gustave Helmer and Jack Mullaney in "The Concert"
- Dick Powell as Colonel Drayton in "Everybody Versus Timmy Drayton"
- Vic Morrow, later of Combat!, as Dr. Bigelow in "A Very Special Citizen"
- Robert Middleton in "Accidental Tourist"
- Whit Bissell as Howard Barron and Otto Kruger as Franklyn Malleson Ghentin in "A Fool for a Client"
- Ross Martin, later on The Wild Wild West, as Frank Brody and Harry Dean Stanton as Harry Walker in "The Enemy"
- Michael Parks, later of Then Came Bronson, in "One by One"
- Roger Mobley, a Disney child actor, as Tommy Pierce in "The Boy Who Said No"
- Eve McVeagh, film and television actress and Hitchcock favorite in episode "The Boy Who Said No"
- John Larch as Richard Walker in "The Reunion"
- Tom Bosley, later of Happy Days, as Assistant District Attorney Ryan in "The Man Who Wanted to Die"
- Jack Albertson, who played Grandpa Joe in the film Willy Wonka & the Chocolate Factory, as Karl Hansen in "Accidental Jeopardy"
- Brenda Scott as Mary in "My Worthy Colleague"

== Production ==
In 2000, James Whitmore said of the series, "That thing arose out of the American Civil Liberties Union ... This was right after the McCarthy thing was so hot in this country, and I thought it was time we did something about the right of people to disagree with one another in a reasonable fashion ... That was the predication of that show, and I produced it ... It was a wonderful experience." ABC had canceled the series after its first season, but thousands of angry letters from fans convinced them to bring the show back in 1962. Whitmore explained, "We were taken off the air after one year, because I didn't want to do the commercials [for] Gleem Toothpaste. They wanted me as that character, that lawyer, to come on and say, 'You ought to use Gleem toothpaste,' and I didn't think I wanted to do that, so they dropped us. Procter and Gamble were our sponsors. Then, they had an astonishing hundreds of thousands of letters. It was engineered by some newspaper guys to get the show back on, and they brought it back on. I believe, if I'm not mistaken, the only time that had ever happened, with a TV show. I think it's happened since, but not at that point. We were brought back for one year."

== Episodes ==
=== Season 1 (1960–61) ===
No. overall	No. in season	Title	Directed by	Written by	Original release date
1	1	"What's in a Name?"	Lamont Johnson	Sy Gomberg	October 7, 1960
2	2	"Music to Hurt By"	David Alexander	Sy Gomberg	October 14, 1960
3	3	"The Baby"	Robert Ellis Miller	Sy Gomberg	October 28, 1960
4	4	"Drivel"	David Alexander	Sy Gomberg	November 4, 1960
5	5	"Semper Fidelis"	Charles Haas	Robert Pirosh	November 11, 1960
6	6	"Promise of Life"	Charles Haas	Les Pine	November 18, 1960
7	7	"The Storyville Gang"	David Alexander	Robert Pirosh	November 25, 1960
8	8	"No Sale"	Charles Haas	Palmer Thompson	December 2, 1960
9	9	"A Question of Guilt"	Robert Ellis Miller	Paul David	December 16, 1960
10	10	"Christmas is a Legal Holiday"	Robert Ellis Miller	Sy Gomberg	December 23, 1960
11	11	"The Long Echo"	Robert Ellis Miller	Paul David	December 30, 1960
12	12	"The Great Gambling Raid"	David Alexander	Sy Gomberg	January 6, 1961
13	13	"The Trophy"	Robert Ellis Miller	Sy Gomberg	January 13, 1961
14	14	"Indian War"	David Alexander	Paul David	January 20, 1961
15	15	"Exit"	Robert Ellis Miller	Paul David	January 27, 1961
16	16	"Unbury the Dead"	Tom Gries	Sy Gomberg	February 3, 1961
17	17	"The End Justifies the End"	David Alexander	Arthur Ross & Sy Gomberg	February 10, 1961
18	18	"Lethal Weapons"	David Alexander	Palmer Thompson	February 17, 1961
19	19	"One for the Money"	David Alexander	Palmer Thompson	February 24, 1961
20	20	"Cold Turkey"	David Alexander	Les Pine	March 3, 1961
21	21	"The Concert"	Robert Ellis Miller	Paul David	March 10, 1961
22	22	"Everybody vs. Timmy Drayton"	Robert Ellis Miller	Franklin Barton & Sy Gomberg	March 17, 1961
23	23	"A Very Special Citizen"	Robert Ellis Miller	Paul David	March 24, 1961
24	24	"Accidental Jeopardy"	Lamont Johnson	Palmer Thompson	March 31, 1961
25	25	"Mea Culpa"	Lamont Johnson	Story by : Arnold & Lois Peyser; Teleplay by : Richard P. McDonagh & Sy Gomberg	April 7, 1961
26	26	"A Fool for a Client"	Lamont Johnson	Ernest Kinoy	April 21, 1961
27	27	"The Enemy"	Robert Ellis Miller	Ernest Kinoy	April 28, 1961
28	28	"One by One"	David Alexander	Wallace Ware	May 5, 1961
29	29	"A Quiet Town"	David Alexander	Richard P. McDonagh	May 12, 1961
30	30	"The Last Commencement"	David Alexander	Unknown	May 19, 1961
31	31	"No Law for Ghosts"	David Alexander	Unknown	May 26, 1961
32	32	"The Broken Hand"	Lamont Johnson	Palmer Thompson	June 2, 1961

=== Season 2 (1962) ===
No. overall	No. in season	Title	Directed by	Written by	Original release date
33	1	"No News is Good News"	Don Medford	William Bast	April 19, 1962
34	2	"The Boy Who Said No"	David Alexander	George Clayton Johnson	April 26, 1962
35	3	"Reunion"	Stuart Rosenberg	Story by : Mort Fine & David Friedkin; Teleplay by : Richard P. McDonagh & Sy Gomberg	May 3, 1962
36	4	"The Walkout"	David Alexander	Shimon Wincelberg	May 10, 1962
37	5	"Everybody is Money"	Sydney Pollack	S. Lee Pogostin	May 17, 1962
38	6	"Wilderness"	David Alexander	Paul David	May 24, 1962
39	7	"The Man Who Wanted to Die"	David Alexander	Sy Gomberg	May 31, 1962
40	8	"The Co-Operatives"	Joseph Sargent	Sy Gomberg	June 7, 1962
41	9	"Thicker Than Water"	John Rich	Palmer Thompson	June 14, 1962
42	10	"What Can You Learn from Smoke Signals?"	John Rich	Sy Gomberg	June 21, 1962
43	11	"C'est La Show Biz"	David Alexander	Story by : William Bast; Teleplay by : Richard P. McDonagh & Sy Gomberg	June 28, 1962
44	12	"My Worthy Colleague"	David Alexander	Paul David	July 5, 1962
45	13	"Poor Eddie's Dead"	Sydney Pollack	Sy Gomberg & Richard P. McDonagh	July 12, 1962
