= 2nd Tony Awards =

1948 US theatrical awards ceremony

- Date: March 28, 1948
- Location: Waldorf-Astoria Hotel; New York City, New York
- Hosted by: Harry Hershfield, Bert Lytell and Hiram Sherman
- Most wins: Mister Roberts (3)

Television/radio coverage
- Network: WOR (radio), Mutual Network (radio)

The 2nd Tony Awards were held on March 28, 1948, at the Waldorf-Astoria Grand Ballroom in New York City, and broadcast on radio station WOR and the Mutual Network. The Masters of Ceremonies were Harry Hershfield, Bert Lytell, and Hiram Sherman. The Antoinette Perry Awards for Excellence in Theatre, or more commonly, the Tony Awards, recognize achievement in live Broadway productions and performances, plus several non-competitive Special Awards (such as the Regional Theatre Award). They are presented by the American Theatre Wing and the League of American Theatres and Producers at an annual ceremony in New York City.

== Ceremony ==
The award for the women was a gold bracelet, with a disc inscribed with the actress' initials and the name of the prize, and the men received a gold bill clip, similarly inscribed.

Performers and performances were: High Button Shoes (Nanette Fabray, Helen Gallagher, and Donald Saddler), Make Mine Manhattan (Kyle MacDonnell and Joshua Shelley), Look, Ma, I'm Dancin'! (Virginia Gorski and Don Liberto), Forest Bonshire, Jack Carter, Stan Fisher, Lisa Kirk, Kathryn Lee, Jack McCauley, Lucy Monroe, Ferruccio Tagliavini and Pia Tassinari (of the Metropolitan Opera), Maggie Teyte (City Center Opera).

== Winners and nominees ==
Source:Tony Awards

Note: There were no pre-announced Tony nominees prior to 1956

=== Production ===
Award	Winner
Best Play	Mister Roberts by Thomas Heggen and Joshua Logan – Producer Leland Hayward
Outstanding Foreign Company	The cast of The Importance of Being Earnest (Donald Bain, Jane Baxter, Pamela Brown, Jean Cadell, Stringer Davis, Robert Flemyng, John Gielgud, John Kidd, Margaret Rutherford, and Richard Wordsworth)

=== Performance ===
Award	Winner
Actor-Play	Henry Fonda (Mister Roberts); Paul Kelly (Command Decision); Basil Rathbone (The Heiress)
Actress-Play	Judith Anderson (Medea); Katharine Cornell (Antony and Cleopatra); Jessica Tandy (A Streetcar Named Desire)
Actor-Musical	Paul Hartman (Angel in the Wings)
Actress-Musical	Grace Hartman (Angel in the Wings)
Newcomer	June Lockhart (For Love or Money); James Whitmore (Command Decision)

=== Craft ===
Award	Winner (s)
Director	Joshua Logan (Mister Roberts)
Costume Designer	Mary Percy Schenck (The Heiress)
Choreographer	Jerome Robbins (High Button Shoes)
Tony Award for Best Conductor and Musical Director	Milton Rosenstock (Finian's Rainbow)
Tony Award for Best Scenic Design	Horace Armistead (The Medium)
Tony Award for Best Stage Technician	George Gebhardt

=== Special awards ===
Award	Winner (s)
Progressive Theatre Operators	Robert W. Dowling, president of City Investing Company, owner of several theatres in New York; Paul Beisman, operator of the American Theatre, St. Louis
Spreading Theatre To The Country While The Originals Perform In New York	Mary Martin (Annie Get Your Gun); Joe E. Brown (Harvey)
Contribution To Development Of Regional Theatre	Barter Theatre, Virginia, Robert Porterfield
Contribution To Theatre Through A Publication	Theatre Arts, Rosamund Gilder, editor
Distinguished Wing Volunteer Worker Through The War And After	Vera Allen
Experiment In Theatre	The Experimental Theatre, Inc., John Garfield accepting
Special Award	George Pierce, for twenty-five years of courteous and efficient service as a backstage doorman (Empire Theatre)

=== Multiple nominations and awards ===
The following productions received multiple awards.

- 3 wins: Mister Roberts
- 2 wins: Angel in the Wings, Command Decision and The Heiress

== See also ==
- 20th Academy Awards
