= Paul Beisman =

American theater manager

- Born: January 16, 1898; St. Louis, Missouri, U.S.
- Died: October 19, 1958 (aged 60); St. Louis, Missouri, U.S.
- Occupation: Theatre manager
- Spouse(s): Zona Keiffer (m. 1921; died 1945); Louise Bernero (m. 1948)

Paul Beisman (January 16, 1898 – October 19, 1958) was an American theater manager. He was manager of the St. Louis, Missouri's Orpheum Theater. Beisman was honored with the Special Tony Award at the 2nd Tony Awards.

== Early life and career ==
Born in St. Louis on January 16, 1898, Beisman was one of two children, both boys, born to Anna (née Goldman) and Julius Beisman. Less than a year later, his father died, and after a decade of strained relations between son and stepfather (Max A. Davis) Beisman was sent to live with his grandparents in Downtown St. Louis, where he graduated from Central High School in 1915. (Note: Although an extensive profile published in 1943 by the St. Louis Globe-Democrat has Beisman graduating in 1916,, contemporaneous stories published by both the G-D and Post-Dispatch clearly include Paul Beisman in their lists of Central High's 81-member Class of 1915.)

== Personal life and death ==
From 1921 until her death in 1945, Weisman was married to Berryville, Arkansas native Zona Kieffer, with whom he had three children, all sons. In 1948, he married Louise Bernero.

On October 19, 1958, aged 60, Beisman died of lung cancer at Barnes Hospital, more than two months after having entered the hospital and undergone surgery. Survived by his wife and his three sons from the prior marriage, Beisman was eulogized at Armbruster Funeral Home in Clayton, and his body buried at Oak Grove Cemetery in St. Louis.
