= Robert W. Dowling =

American businessman (1895–1973)

Robert Dowling

Robert W. Dowling (September 9, 1895 – August 28, 1973) was a real estate investor and philanthropist in the New York City area. Dowling College was named for him.

== Biography ==
Robert Whittle Dowling was born in New York City. His father Robert Emmett Dowling was president of the City Investing real estate firm. In 1915 he made the first recorded swim around Manhattan (in 13 hours 45 minutes). Following his father's death in 1943, he took over his father's company.

Although Dowling had no formal education beyond high school, his advice was sought for the design and establishment of the Parkchester, Stuyvesant Town, and Peter Cooper Village real estate ventures. All three ventures marked a change in the classic New York City grid to create housing developments within a campus setting. Dowling received a Special Tony Award in 1948 for his contribution to theatre as result of his ownership of the Fulton Theatre, Morosco Theatre and Coronet Theatre and Gaiety Theatre

In 1957, he was among the developers who transformed the Globe Movie Theatre into a legitimate Broadway theatre now called the Lunt-Fontaine Theatre. He was among the producers of the original Sound of Music. Dowling, who was a friend of Adelphi University dean Allyn P. Robinson, provided a grant of $3 million in 1968, which allowed the Adelphi campus in Oakdale, New York to become independent and it became Dowling College. Dowling College closed in 2016.
