= James Whitmore =

American actor (1921–2009)

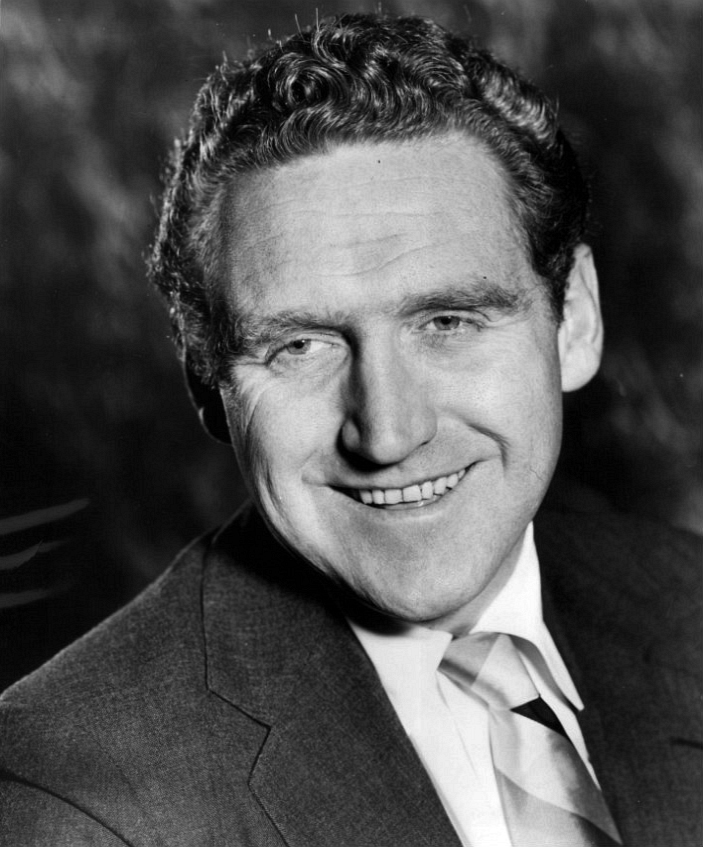
- Whitmore in 1955
- Born: James Allen Whitmore Jr. October 1, 1921; White Plains, New York, U.S.
- Died: February 6, 2009 (aged 87); Malibu, California, U.S.
- Education: Yale College
- Occupation: Actor
- Years active: 1946–2007
- Spouses: Nancy Mygatt (m. 1947; div. 1971); (m. 1979; div. 1981); Audra Lindley (m. 1972; div. 1979); Noreen Nash (m. 2001)
- Children: 3, including James Whitmore Jr.
- Military career
- Allegiance: United States
- Branch: United States Marine Corps
- Rank: Second Lieutenant
- Units: Marine Forces Reserve; 4th Marine Division
- Conflicts: World War II

James Allen Whitmore Jr. (October 1, 1921 – February 6, 2009) was an American actor who appeared in over 150 stage, film, and television roles over a 50-year career. He received numerous honors, notably a Grammy Award, a Primetime Emmy Award, and a Tony Award. He was nominated for two Academy Awards, Best Supporting Actor for Battleground (1949) and Best Actor for Give 'em Hell, Harry! (1975).

== Early life ==
James Allen Whitmore Jr. was born in White Plains, New York, to Florence Belle (née Crane) and James Allen Whitmore Sr., a park commission official. Whitmore attended Amherst Central High School in Snyder, New York, for three years, before transferring to the Choate School in Wallingford, Connecticut, on a football scholarship. He studied at Yale College, but he had to quit playing football after severely injuring his knees.

After giving up football, Whitmore turned to the Yale Dramatic Society and began acting. While at Yale, he was a member of Skull and Bones, and was among the founders of the Yale radio station (the student-run WOCD-AM, later renamed WYBC-AM). Whitmore planned on becoming a lawyer and graduated with a major in government from Yale University.

== Military service ==
In World War II, he enlisted in the United States Marine Corps Reserve in 1942 while finishing his degree, which he completed in 1944. In the Marines, he trained at Parris Island and Quantico, Virginia, and Officers Candidate School, and was commissioned a second lieutenant. After further training he was assigned to the 4th Marine Division on Saipan in July 1944. While at Tinian, he contracted amoebic dysentery and was hospitalized. Following his hospitalization, he served guard duty at the Panama Canal Zone until his discharge in March 1946.

== Career ==
=== Film and television ===
Whitmore appeared on Broadway in the role of the sergeant in Command Decision. His first major picture for MGM was Battleground, in a role that was turned down by Spencer Tracy. He was nominated for the Academy Award for Best Supporting Actor for this role, and won the Golden Globe Award as Best Performance by an Actor In A Supporting Role. Other major films included Angels in the Outfield, The Asphalt Jungle, The Next Voice You Hear, Above and Beyond, Kiss Me, Kate, Them!, Oklahoma!, Black Like Me, Guns of the Magnificent Seven, Tora! Tora! Tora!, and Give 'em Hell, Harry!, a one-man show for which Whitmore was nominated for the Academy Award for Best Actor for his portrayal of former U.S. President Harry S Truman. In the film Tora! Tora! Tora!, he played Admiral William F. "Bull" Halsey.

Whitmore appeared during the 1950s on many television anthology series. He was cast as Father Emil Kapaun in the 1955 episode "The Good Thief" in the ABC religion anthology series Crossroads. Other roles followed on Jane Wyman Presents the Fireside Theater, Lux Video Theatre, Kraft Theatre, Studio One in Hollywood, Schlitz Playhouse, Matinee Theatre, and the Ford Television Theatre. In 1958, he carried the lead in "The Gabe Carswell Story" of NBC's Wagon Train, with Ward Bond.(S1 E18 which aired 1/14/1958).

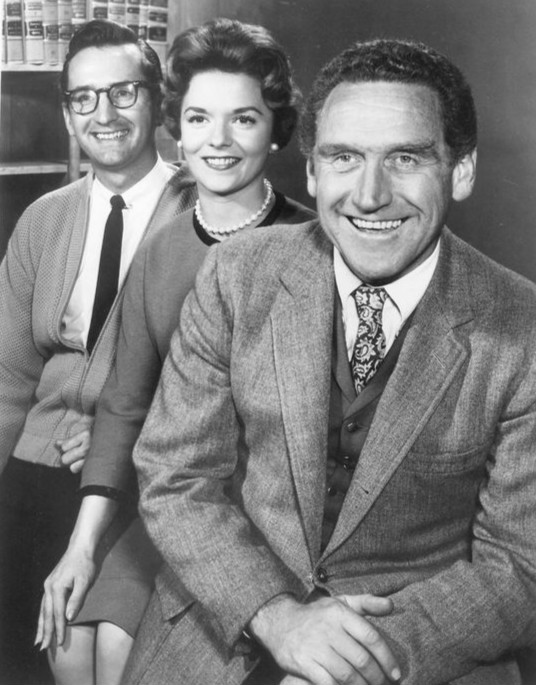
Publicity photo of Conlan Carter, Janet De Gore and Whitmore from the television series The Law and Mr. Jones

In 1963, Whitmore played Captain William Benteen in The Twilight Zone episode "On Thursday We Leave for Home". Whitmore also appeared in Route 66 on January 18, 1963, as Ralph Vincent in “A Gift for a Warrior.” He appeared twice in Twelve O'Clock High. In 1965, Whitmore guest-starred as Col. Paul "Pappy" Hartley in Season 1, Episode 32 "The Hero" and as Col. Harry Connelly in 1966 Season 3, Episode 12 "The Ace". He also appeared in an episode of Combat! titled "The Cassock", as a German officer masquerading as a Catholic priest. In 1967, he guest-starred as a security guard in The Invaders episode, "Quantity: Unknown". That same year, Whitmore also appeared on an episode of ABC's Custer starring Wayne Maunder in the title role.

In 1968, he appeared as head of the Simian Assembly in the Planet of the Apes. In 1969, he played the leading character of Professor Woodruff in the TV series My Friend Tony, produced by NBC. Whitmore also made several memorable appearances on the classic ABC Western The Big Valley starring Barbara Stanwyck, and the classic NBC Western The Virginian starring James Drury, during the second half of the 1960s.

From 1972 to 1973, Whitmore played Dr. Vincent Campanelli in the short-lived ABC medical sitcom Temperatures Rising.

Whitmore appeared as General Oliver O. Howard in the 1975 television film I Will Fight No More Forever, based on the 1877 conflict between the United States Army and the Nez Percé tribe, led by Chief Joseph. In 1979, Whitmore hosted a talk show of 22 episodes called simply Comeback. One of those segments focuses on the helicopter inventor Igor Sikorsky. In 1980 he starred as Borski, a therapist treating imprisoned sex-offenders, in the made-for-television movie Rage! directed by William A. Graham. In 1980, Whitmore appeared as Jake Reeves the terminally ill father of coach Reeves in a two episode arc of the television series White Shadow. In 1986, Whitmore voiced Mark Twain in the first claymation feature film The Adventures of Mark Twain.

In 1994, Whitmore appeared in the role of prison librarian Brooks Hatlen in the critically acclaimed and Academy Award-nominated Frank Darabont film The Shawshank Redemption, starring Tim Robbins and Morgan Freeman; Whitmore received much praise for his poignant portrayal of Brooks, the old con and his performance won him a legion of new fans. Two years later, he co-starred in the 1997 horror/sci-fi film The Relic. In 1999, he played Raymond Oz in two episodes of The Practice, earning a Primetime Emmy Award for Outstanding Guest Actor in a Drama Series.

In 2002, Whitmore played the role of the grandfather in the Disney Channel original film A Ring of Endless Light. Also in 2002, Whitmore played a supporting role in The Majestic, a film that starred Jim Carrey. In 2003, Whitmore appeared as Josh Brolin's father on the short-lived NBC drama series Mister Sterling, for which he was nominated for an Emmy Award.

In April 2007, he made his last screen appearance in a C.S.I. episode titled "Ending Happy" as Milton, an elderly man.

=== Theatre work ===
"Whitmore often said he found acting in films and television boring because of the long waits between scenes; his passion was for the theater, and he continued to act on stage throughout his long career." Whitmore first ventured into acting at Yale University – severe knee injuries sidelined him from football, so he turned to the Yale Dramatic Society. After serving in the Marines he toured the South Pacific in a USO tour, then returned to America, where he studied acting for six months at the American Theatre Wing in New York and the Actors Studio. Afterward, he was hired by a summer stock company in Peterborough, New Hampshire – The Peterborough Players. In 1947 he was selected to appear in a production of All My Sons, representing the U.S. at the World Youth Festival in Prague.

His first play on Broadway – Command Decision – in which Whitmore played the part of Tech Sergeant Harold Evans, was the smash hit of 1947, and Whitmore received a non-competitive Special Tony Award for "Best Newcomer of the Season". Whitmore continued to be active in the theatre for all of his career, performing on Broadway, at Ford's Theatre in Washington DC, and on tour. He later won the title "King of the One Man Show" after appearing in the solo vehicles Will Rogers' USA (1970) (repeating the role for TV in 1972); as Harry Truman in Give 'em Hell, Harry! (1975) (repeating the role in the film version, for which he was nominated for an Oscar); and as Theodore Roosevelt in Bully (1977), although the latter production did not repeat the success of the first two.

"Whitmore, who was an early student at the Actors Studio in New York in the late '40s, taught an acting workshop after moving to Hollywood. Among his students in the early '50s was young James Dean, whom Whitmore advised to go to New York. 'I owe a lot to Whitmore,' Dean told Seventeen magazine in 1955. 'One thing he said helped more than anything. He told me I didn't know the difference between acting as a soft job and acting as a difficult art.'" Whitmore often returned to New Hampshire to the Peterborough Players, where he got his start in summer stock – in 2008 he played the stage manager in Our Town. Each year the Peterborough Players award the "James Whitmore Award" to an excellent intern at the theatre.

== Personal life ==
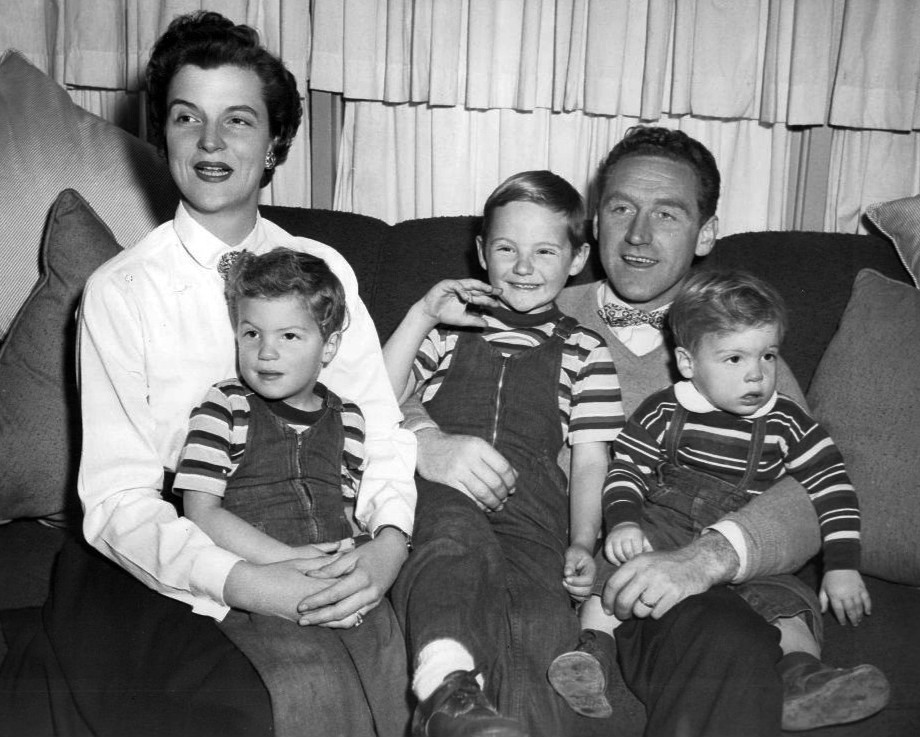
Nancy Mygatt and Whitmore in 1954 with their sons (from left): Stephen, James Jr., and Danny

Whitmore married his first wife, Nancy Mygatt, in 1947. The couple had three sons before their divorce in 1971. The eldest son, James III, found success as a television actor and director under the name James Whitmore Jr. The second son, Stephen, became the public spokesman for the Los Angeles County Sheriff's Department. The youngest son, Daniel, was a Forest Service Snow Ranger and firefighter before he launched his own construction company. In 1979, Whitmore and Mygatt remarried, but they divorced again after two years.

Whitmore was married to actress Audra Lindley from 1972 until 1979. He co-starred in several stage performances with her both during and after their marriage. These included Elba (a play by Vaughn McBride about an elderly couple who escape from their nursing home); William Gibson's Handy Dandy (he as a conservative judge, she as a liberal nun); and Tom Cole's About Time (in which they played characters identified simply as the Old Man and the Old Woman).

In 2001, he married actress and author Noreen Nash. Whitmore is the grandfather of Survivor: Gabon contestant Matty Whitmore. In 2010, James Whitmore Jr., and his two children (grandchildren of James Whitmore), actress-director Aliah Whitmore and artist-production designer Jacob Whitmore, formed the theatre group Whitmore Eclectic. They perform in Los Angeles, California.

In his later years, Whitmore spent his summers in Peterborough, New Hampshire, performing with the Peterborough Players.

Although he was not always politically active, in 2007, Whitmore generated some publicity with his endorsement of Barack Obama for U.S. President. In January 2008, Whitmore appeared in television commercials for the First Freedom First campaign, which advocates preserving "the separation of church and state" and protecting religious liberty.

According to the Los Angeles Times, "An avid flower and vegetable gardener, Whitmore was also known to TV viewers as the longtime commercial pitchman for Miracle-Gro garden products."

He had a cat called Monkey, whose playful photos are preserved in LIFE photo collection in New York.

== Death ==
Whitmore was diagnosed with lung cancer in November 2008. He died from the disease at the age of 87 on February 6, 2009, at his Malibu, California home. He was cremated and his ashes were scattered in the Pacific Ocean.

== Filmography ==
=== Partial filmography ===
1940s

- The Undercover Man (1949) as George Pappas
- Battleground (1949) as Kinnie

1950s

- The Outriders (1950) as Clint Priest
- Please Believe Me (1950) as Vincent Maran
- The Asphalt Jungle (1950) as Gus Minissi
- The Next Voice You Hear... (1950) as Joe Smith, American
- Mrs. O'Malley and Mr. Malone (1950) as John J. Malone
- The Red Badge of Courage (1951) as Narrator (voice, uncredited)
- Angels in the Outfield (1951) as Angel voice (voice, uncredited)
- Across the Wide Missouri (1951) as Old Bill (uncredited)
- It's a Big Country (1951) as Mr. Stacey
- Shadow in the Sky (1952) as Lou Hopke
- Because You're Mine (1952) as Sergeant 'Bat' Batterson
- Above and Beyond (1952) as Maj. William 'Bill' M. Uanna – Security Officer, Operation Silverplate
- The Girl Who Had Everything (1953) as Charles 'Chico' Menlow
- Kiss Me Kate (1953) as Slug
- All the Brothers Were Valiant (1953) as Fetcher
- The Great Diamond Robbery (1954) as Mr. Remlick, Lawyer
- The Command (1954) as Sgt. Elliott
- Them! (1954) as Police Sgt. Ben Peterson
- Battle Cry (1955) as MSgt. Mac / Narrator
- The McConnell Story (1955) as SSgt. / Maj. / Col. Ty 'Dad' Whitman
- Oklahoma! (1955) as Mr. Carnes
- The Last Frontier (1955) as Gus
- The Eddy Duchin Story (1956) as Lou Sherwood
- Crime in the Streets (1956) as Ben Wagner
- The Young Don't Cry (1957) as Rudy Krist
- The Deep Six (1958) as Commander Warren Meredith
- The Restless Years (1958) as Ed Henderson
- Face of Fire (1959) as Monk Johnson

1960s

- The Law and Mr. Jones (1960) as Abraham Lincoln Jones
- Who Was That Lady? (1960) as Harry Powell
- ’’Rawhide 1962 Incident of the Dog Faces as Sgt. Joe Duclos
- Going My Way as Dr. Corden in "Tell Me When You Get to Heaven" (1963) as Dr. Corden
- The Twilight Zone, "On Thursday We Leave for Home" (TV Series) (1963) as Captain Benteen
- Black Like Me (1964) as John Finley Horton
- The Tenderfoot (1964), Disney's The Wonderful World of Color as Captain Ewell
- Kraft Suspense Theatre "A Lion Amongst Men" (1964) as Major Will Stanton
- Gunsmoke (1965) "The Reward" as Jim Forbes
- Combat! "The Cassock" (TV Series) (1965) as Hertzbrun
- The Big Valley "The Death Merchant" (1966) as Handy Random
- The Big Valley "Target" (1966) as Joshua "Josh" Adam Hawks
- Chuka (1967) as Lou Trent
- Waterhole #3 (1967) as Capt. Shipley
- The Big Valley "Night In a Small Town" (1967) as Tom Willis
- The Invaders "Quantity: Unknown" (1967) as Harry Swain
- Nobody's Perfect (1968) as Capt. Mike Riley
- Planet of the Apes (1968) as President of the Assembly
- Madigan (1968) as Chief Insp. Charles Kane
- The Split (1968) as Herb Sutro
- Bonanza (TV) Episode – "To Die in Darkness" (1968) as John Postley
- The Big Valley "Shadow of a Giant" (1968) as Marshal Seth Campbell
- Guns of the Magnificent Seven (1969) as Levi

1970s

- The Challenge (1970) (TV) as Overman
- Tora! Tora! Tora! (1970) as Vice Admiral William F. Halsey
- Chato's Land (1972) as Joshua Everette
- The Harrad Experiment (1973) as Philip Tenhausen
- High Crime (1973) as Commissioner Aldo Scavino
- Where the Red Fern Grows (1974) (TV) as Grandpa
- The Balloon Vendor (1974) as Antonio
- I Will Fight No More Forever (1975) (TV) as General Oliver O. Howard
- Give 'em Hell, Harry! (1975) as Harry S Truman
- The Serpent's Egg (1977) as The Priest
- The Word (TV) (1978) as George Wheeler

1980s

- The First Deadly Sin (1980) as Dr. Sanford Ferguson
- Rage! (1980) as [Dr] Borski
- The White Shadow (1980) as Jake Reeves
- Hail Columbia! (1982) narrator
- The Adventures of Mark Twain (1985) as Mark Twain (voice)
- Zoo Ship (1985) (voice)
- All My Sons (1987) (TV) as Joe Keller
- Nuts (1987) as Judge Stanley Murdoch
- Glory! Glory! (1989) (TV) as Lester Babbitt

1990s

- Sky High (1990) as Gus Johnson
- Old Explorers (1990) as Leinen Roth
- The Shawshank Redemption (1994) as Brooks Hatlen
- The Relic (1997) as Dr. Albert Frock
- Swing Vote (1999) as Daniel Morissey
- The Practice (1999) as Raymond Oz

2000s

- Here's to Life! (2000) as Gus Corley
- The Majestic (2001) as Stan Keller
- A Ring of Endless Light (2002) as Grandfather
- Fun with Dick and Jane (2005) as Toy Store Security Guard (uncredited)
- CSI: Crime Scene Investigation episode "Ending Happy" (2007) (TV) as Milton (final appearance)

=== Stage ===
James Whitmore's theatre roles included:

- Command Decision – as Tech Sergeant Harold Evans – Fulton Theatre, New York, NY – (October 1, 1947 – September 18, 1948).

Whitmore received a 1948 Tony Award for this role. The category was "Outstanding Performance by a Newcomer".

- Winesburg, Ohio – as Tom Willard – National Theatre, New York, NY – (Feb 5 – 15, 1958).
- Inquest – as Emanuel Bloch – Music Box Theatre, New York, NY – (Apr 23 – May 16, 1970).
- Will Rogers' USA – Solo Performance as Will Rogers – Helen Hayes Theatre, New York, NY – (May 6–11, 1974).
- Give 'Em Hell, Harry! – Solo Performance as Harry Truman – Ford's Theatre, Washington, DC – (April 15 – May 4, 1975).

After the world premiere at the Ford's Theatre, the play went on to a six-city tour, during which it was videotaped for film at the Moore Theater, Seattle, Washington.

- Bully – Solo Performance as Theodore Roosevelt – 46th Street Theatre, New York, NY – (November 1, 1977 – November 6, 1977).
- Almost an Eagle – as The Colonel – Longacre Theatre, New York, NY – (December 16, 1982 – December 19, 1982).
- Inherit the Wind – as Henry Drummond – Ford's Theatre, Washington, DC – (Sep 26 – November 5, 2000).

=== Radio ===
- Family Theater – episode "The Visitor" (1952)

== Accolades ==
Year	Award	Category	Work	Result	Ref.
1949	Academy Awards	Best Supporting Actor	Battleground	Nominated	
1975	Academy Awards	Best Actor	Give 'em Hell, Harry!	Nominated	
1990	CableACE Awards	Outstanding Supporting Actor in a Movie or Miniseries	Glory! Glory!	Won	
2001	Genie Awards	Best Actor in a Leading Role	Here's to Life!	Nominated	
1949	Golden Globe Awards	Best Supporting Actor – Motion Picture	Battleground	Won	
1975	Golden Globe Awards	Best Actor in a Motion Picture – Drama	Give 'em Hell, Harry!	Nominated	
1971	Grammy Awards	Best Spoken Word Recording	Will Rogers' USA	Nominated	
1975	Grammy Awards	Best Spoken Word Recording	Give 'em Hell, Harry!	Won	
2000	Online Film & Television Association Awards	Best Guest Actor in a Drama Series	The Practice	Nominated	
2000	Primetime Emmy Awards	Outstanding Guest Actor in a Drama Series	The Practice	Won	
2003	Primetime Emmy Awards	Outstanding Guest Actor in a Drama Series	Mister Sterling	Nominated	
1948	Theatre World Awards		Command Decision	Won	
1948	Tony Awards	Outstanding Performance by a Newcomer	Command Decision	Won (Note: Tied with June Lockhart in For Love or Money.)	
1964	Western Heritage Awards	Fictional Television Drama	Rawhide (Episode: "Incident of Iron Bull")	Won	
1976	Western Heritage Awards	Factual Television Program	I Will Fight No More Forever	Won	

Whitmore has a star on the Hollywood Walk of Fame at 6611 Hollywood Boulevard. The ceremony was held on February 8, 1960.

== See also ==
- List of people from California
- List of people from New York City
- List of Yale University people
