= Command Decision (play) =

1948 play written by William Wister Haines

- Original language: English
- Written by: William Wister Haines
- Characters: Gen. Casey Dennis; Gen. R.G. Kane; T/Sgt. Harold Evans; Elmer Brockhurst; Col. Ted Martin; Gen. Cliff Garnett
- Genre: Drama
- Setting: 5th Bomb Division headquarters, England, 1943

Premiere
- Date: October 1, 1947
- Place: Fulton Theatre, Broadway

Command Decision was a 1947 play in three acts written by William Wister Haines, and formed the basis for his best-selling novel of the same name. Produced by Kermit Bloomgarden and directed by John O'Shaughnessy, it ran for 409 performances from October 1, 1947, to September 18, 1948, at the Fulton Theatre in New York City. Paul Kelly won the Tony Award for Best Actor in a Play that year, while James Whitmore received the Tony Award for Best Newcomer.

Haines, a novelist, served during World War II as an intelligence officer on the staff of the U.S. Eighth Air Force in England between 1942 and 1945. From his experiences he wrote Command Decision as a stage play in 1945 but was unable to sell it. He followed suggestions that he first publish it in novel form and the book became both a best-seller and critical success. Dialogue describing the infighting to build strategic airpower over the two decades preceding U.S. participation in World War II, particularly spoken by General Kane, are thinly disguised versions of actual events and personages.

The play was adapted in 1948 as a film of the same name.

== Plot synopsis ==
Although in three acts, the action is played out in four sections. Act II is divided into two scenes each as long as Act I, while Act III is approximately half the length of the others.

=== Act I ===
About 4 P.M. on a Saturday afternoon

In the second half of 1943, War correspondent Elmer Brockhurst enters the headquarters office of the commanding general of the U.S. Army Air Forces' Fifth Bombardment Division . He questions the general's orderly, T/Sgt. Harold Evans, about a mysterious German fighter under guard in a hangar and the record losses of B-17s on a mission the day before, then tries to milk him for information about the arrest of a squadron commander, Captain Lucius Jenks. Evans rebuffs him.

Brig. Gen. K. C. "Casey" Dennis comes into his office to discuss the daily round of problems with his chief of staff, Col. Haley, and to interview Jenks. He soon finds that he has an unexpected public relations crisis on his hands after losing 40 bombers on the previous day's mission. His superior, Maj. Gen. R.G. Kane, enters during the interview, bringing with him Brig. Gen. Clifton C. Garnett from the Pentagon, a West Point classmate and career rival of Dennis —and brother-in-law to Dennis's operations officer, Col. Ted Martin. Garnett's greeting reveals that Dennis took command of the Fifth Division not long before when their mutual friend Joe Lucas was killed. Garnett's visit stirs speculation that he has been sent by the United Chiefs to replace either Kane or Dennis in command.

Dennis and Brockhurst, old antagonists in conflicts between the military and the press, clash again when Jenks attempts to reveal the day's target to the reporter. Kane asks Brockhurst to leave for security reason, and Dennis identifies the target as Schweinhafen. Kane realizes Dennis has begun Operation Stitch in Kane's absence. Kane takes Jenks outside to talk to him privately; in his absence Garnett quibbles with Dennis over the danger inherent in Ted Martin leading missions. When Kane returns, Garnett demands to be informed about the nature of Stitch. Dennis outlines the threat of new German German jet fighters, and that Stitch seeks to destroy the factories building them before they can go into operation and crush American strategic bombing. It becomes clear that Kane has deliberately withheld information about the jet from the Pentagon to delay the operation and hold down losses.

The return of the day's mission interrupts, culminating in the off-stage crash of a bomber. Evans steers the visitors out of the office on a pretext, allowing Dennis time with Martin, who reveals that they attacked the wrong target. Martin urges him to keep quiet about the mistake, because the two cities are indistinguishable, until they can finish the job. As the curtain comes down on Act I, Dennis reminds Martin that Kane must be told because he is in command.

=== Act II ===
==== Scene 1 ====
About 10 P.M. the same evening

Kane and party return as Dennis impatiently waits to send out his field order for the next day's mission. Brockhurst has been taken into Kane's confidence regarding Stitch. Lt. Goldberg, a bombardier, enters with photographs identifying the target struck in error, the revelation of the mistake triggering shock and outrage in the others.

Kane and Dennis are both ensnared in political minefields. Kane's headquarters reports that a visiting congressional oversight committee is due. Garnett's presence strongly implies to both that unless low loss missions are laid on, to strengthen the Air Force's position at a resource allocation conference in the Pentagon in three days, either or both might be relieved of command. Dennis, however, is concerned only with Stitch. A third city, Fendelhorst, must also be attacked, and Dennis's bomb division is the only unit able to reach these targets beyond the range of escorting U.S. fighters. A rare stretch of clear weather, about to end, presents an opportunity to complete the operation before the Luftwaffe can mount an impenetrable defense. In Dennis's judgment, the mission is worth any cost.

Unbeknownst to Dennis, Garnett offers Martin a job as chief of staff (with a promotion) in the B-29 command he expects to receive. Kane denies permission to attack Schweinhafen again but Dennis blackmails him by threatening to prefer charges against Capt. Jenks. Aware that Jenks is a constituent of Congressman Malcolm of the visiting Military Affairs Committee, Dennis coerces Kane into giving permission to continue Stitch by contriving to have Jenks (who refused to fly the mission to Schweinhafen) accompany Malcolm and receive a medal during the Committee's visit. At the curtain for Scene 1, Martin warns Dennis that Kane will renege on his permission by recalling the mission after it takes off and demands assignment as mission leader.

==== Scene 2 ====
Sunday Noon, the following day

The second attack on Schweinhafen is already underway as Kane's aide gives a scripted presentation promoting strategic airpower to the visiting congressional committee. Congressman Malcolm quickly shows an animus to Dennis, charging him with recklessly causing heavy losses. Tensions rise, but Evans uses political savvy and liquor to ease the situation. Brockhurst apologizes to Dennis when he learns that Kane has let the mission proceed, only to send a recall order he knows will be ignored by Martin, to shift any blame for losses to Dennis. Martin sends the signal that this time Schweinhafen has been destroyed. During the ceremony to decorate Jenks, however, Dennis is brought a message that Martin's B-17 is shot down and Malcolm angrily accuses Dennis of killing Martin. Dennis shakes him by the lapels and flings him into a chair. At the close of Act II, Kane relieves Dennis of command and replaces him with Garnett.

=== Act III ===
Sunday the same day. About 8 P.M.

Evans prepares the office for its new occupant. As Garnett queries each member of his staff about the next day's operations, he clearly seeks justification to order an easy mission. Dennis enters to see if there is any further news about Martin's fate, and commiserates with Garnett, stunning him with the disclosure that their seemingly imperturbable predecessor, Joe Lucas, actually died a suicide after repeatedly ordering men to their deaths. Garnett suddenly realizes that Dennis hated every minute of his duties. Despite a conversation with a drunken homesick pilot, Capt. George Washington Culpepper Lee, who looks forward to a "milk run" for the final mission of his tour, Garnett makes the command decision to attack Fendelhorst while the weather permits. Dennis looks forward to a training command in the United States, where he can be near his family, but a message from the Pentagon orders him to China and the new B-29 command. Dennis orders Evans to get his gear too.

== Opening night cast ==
In order of appearance

- Edmon Ryan ... War correspondent Elmer Brockhurst
- James Whitmore ... Tech Sergeant Harold Evans
- Paul Kelly ... Brigadier General K.C. Dennis
- Neill O'Malley ... Colonel Ernest Haley
- West Hooker ... Enlisted Armed Guard
- Arthur Franz ... Captain Lucius Jenks
- Jay Fassett ... Major General Roland Goodlow Kane
- Paul McGrath ... Brigadier General Clifton C. Garnett
- William Layton ... Major Homer Prescott
- Stephen Elliott ... Colonel Edward Martin
- John Randolph ... Lt. Jake Goldberg
- Lewis Martin ... Major Desmond Lansing
- Robert Pike ... Major Belding Davis
- Walter Black ... Major Rufus Dayhuff
- Paul Ford ... Mr. Arthur Malcolm
- Frank McNellis ... Mr. Oliver Stone
- James Holden ... Captain G. W. C. Lee
- Ed Binns ... N.C.O. Photographer

=== Casting notes ===
Edward Binns, who opened in the small role of a military photographer, took over the supporting cast role of Col. Ernest "Ernie" Haley, Dennis's chief of staff. Assistant stage manager Leonard Patrick then assumed the role of the photographer during the remainder of the run.

== Production ==
The setting as described by Haines is the headquarters office of General Dennis in the headquarters of the Fifth Bombardment Division, Heavy, in England. The set depicts one end of a large, curved-roofed Nissen hut with the entrance door on the back wall left, entering from an ante-room. An alcove on the back wall right leads to a second door, through which the clicking of a teleprinter can be heard. The office is furnished with filing cabinets, chairs, a large desk, and a pot-bellied coal stove. On its back wall are curtained status boards and wall maps, and a rack of Tommy guns. On the left wall are large windows looking out on an airfield. An audio tape of sound effects of the teleprinter, flying and crashing bombers, and sirens is offered by the publisher.

== Awards and nominations ==
Year	Award	Category	Nominee	Result	Ref.
1948	Tony Awards	Best Performance by a Leading Actor in a Play	Paul Kelly	Won (Note: Tied with Henry Fonda for Mister Roberts and Basil Rathbone for The Heiress.)	
1948	Tony Awards	Outstanding Performance by a Newcomer	James Whitmore	Won (Note: Tied with June Lockhart in For Love or Money.)	
1948	Theatre World Award		James Whitmore	Won	
