= Janet De Gore =

American television and theatre actress

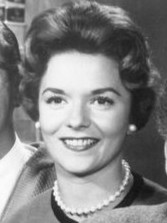
- De Gore in The Law and Mr. Jones, 1962
- Born: Larchmont, New York, U.S.
- Occupations: Television and theatre actress
- Years active: 1950–1966

Janet De Gore was an American television and theatre actress.

== Biography ==
De Gore was born in Larchmont, New York, She began her career in 1950, starring as Janice in the Broadway play The Member of the Wedding.

De Gore appeared in television programs including The Real McCoys, 77 Sunset Strip, Sugarfoot, The Outer Limits, Perry Mason, Branded, and The Farmer's Daughter. She starred in the legal drama television series The Law and Mr. Jones as the title character's secretary, Marsha Spear. She retired in 1966; her last television credit was for the Western series Bonanza.
