= Robert E. Merriman =

Robert E. Merriman (November 5, 1916 – February 2, 1983), was an actor, a Tony Award winning producer, and a director for Broadway theatre, Off Broadway and television. He was the winner of the Drama Desk Award for his performance as Quillery in Idiot's Delight.

== Biography ==
He was born on November 5, 1916, in Willmette, Illinois.

He worked as the stage manager for Barefoot in the Park. He was also the production manager for The Wall and Saratoga.

In 1954 he founded Proscenium Productions at the Cherry Lane Theater, in Greenwich Village. In 1955 he received a Tony Award for the company's production of Thieves Carnival, the first one awarded for an Off Broadway production.

He directed the London production of The Music Man in 1962.

He died on February 2, 1983.
