= 16th Tony Awards =

1962 US theatrical awards ceremony

- Date: April 29, 1962
- Location: Waldorf-Astoria; New York City, New York
- Hosted by: Ray Bolger; Robert Preston
- Most wins: How to Succeed in Business Without Really Trying (7)
- Most nominations: No Strings (9)

Television/radio coverage
- Network: WCBS-TV

The 16th Annual Tony Awards took place on April 29, 1962, in the Waldorf-Astoria Grand Ballroom in New York City. The ceremony was broadcast on local television station WCBS-TV (Channel 2) in New York City. The Masters of Ceremonies were Ray Bolger and Robert Preston.

== Eligibility ==
Shows that opened on Broadway during the 1961–1962 season before March 30, 1962 are eligible.

Original plays

- The Aspern Papers
- Blood, Sweat and Stanley Poole
- A Call on Kuprin
- The Captains and the Kings
- The Caretaker
- The Complaisant Lover
- A Cook for Mr. General
- Daughter of Silence
- Do You Know the Milky Way?
- The Egg
- Everybody Loves Opal
- A Far Country
- First Love
- The Garden of Sweets
- Gideon
- A Gift of Time
- Great Day in the Morning
- Isle of Children
- Look, We've Come Through
- A Man for All Seasons
- Mandingo
- The Night of the Iguana
- A Passage to India
- Purlie Victorious
- Romulus
- Ross
- General Seeger
- A Shot in the Dark
- Something About a Soldier
- Sunday in New York
- Take Her, She's Mine
- Write Me a Murder

Original musicals

- All American
- The Billy Barnes People
- Carnival!
- Donnybrook!
- A Family Affair
- From the Second City
- The Gay Life
- The Happiest Girl in the World
- How to Succeed in Business Without Really Trying
- I Can Get It for You Wholesale
- Kean
- Kwamina
- Let It Ride
- Milk and Honey
- New Faces of 1962
- No Strings
- Sail Away
- Subways Are for Sleeping
- The Young Abe Lincoln

Play revivals

- Giants, Sons of Giants
- Hamlet
- Macbeth
- Romeo and Juliet
- Saint Joan

== The ceremony ==
Presenters: Judith Anderson, Art Carney, Ossie Davis, Ruby Dee, Olivia de Havilland, Albert Dekker, Anita Gillette, Hermione Gingold, Robert Goulet, Helen Hayes, Celeste Holm, Sally Ann Howes, Ron Husman, Hal March, Helen Menken, Geraldine Page, Hugh O'Brian, Elaine Perry, Tom Poston and Jason Robards. The performer was Mimi Benzell. Music was by Meyer Davis and his Orchestra.

== Winners and nominees ==
Winners are in bold

Best Play	Best Musical
**A Man for All Seasons – Robert Bolt**; Gideon – Paddy Chayefsky; The Caretaker – Harold Pinter; The Night of the Iguana – Tennessee Williams	**How to Succeed in Business Without Really Trying**; Carnival!; Milk and Honey; No Strings
Best Producer (Dramatic)	Best Producer (Musical)
**Robert Whitehead and Roger L. Stevens – A Man for All Seasons**; Charles Bowden and Viola Rubber – The Night of the Iguana; Fred Coe and Arthur Cantor – Gideon; David Merrick – Ross	**Cy Feuer and Ernest H. Martin – How to Succeed in Business Without Really Trying**; Helen Bonfils, Haila Stoddard and Charles Russel – Sail Away; David Merrick – Carnival!; Gerard Oestriecher – Milk and Honey
Best Author (Musical)	Best Original Score (Music and/or Lyrics) Written for the Theatre
**Abe Burrows, Jack Weinstock and Willie Gilbert – How to Succeed in Business Without Really Trying**; Michael Stewart and Helen Deutsch – Carnival!	**No Strings – Richard Rodgers (music and lyrics)**; Kwamina – Richard Adler (music and lyrics); Milk and Honey – Jerry Herman (music and lyrics); How to Succeed in Business Without Really Trying – Frank Loesser (music and lyrics)
Best Performance by a Leading Actor in a Play	Best Performance by a Leading Actress in a Play
**Paul Scofield – A Man for All Seasons as Sir Thomas More**; Fredric March – Gideon as Angel; John Mills – Ross as Aircraftman Ross; Donald Pleasence – The Caretaker as Davies	**Margaret Leighton – The Night of the Iguana as Hannah Jelkes**; Gladys Cooper – A Passage to India as Mrs. Moore; Colleen Dewhurst – Great Day in the Morning as Phoebe Flaherty; Kim Stanley – A Far Country as Elizabeth von Ritter
Best Performance by a Leading Actor in a Musical	Best Performance by a Leading Actress in a Musical
**Robert Morse – How to Succeed in Business Without Really Trying as J. Pierrepont Finch**; Ray Bolger – All American as Professor Fodorski; Alfred Drake – Kean as Edmund Kean; Richard Kiley – No Strings as David Jordan	**Anna Maria Alberghetti – Carnival! as Lili Daurier** (tie); **Diahann Carroll – No Strings as Barbara Woodruff** (tie); Molly Picon – Milk and Honey as Clara Weiss; Elaine Stritch – Sail Away as Mimi Paragon
Best Performance by a Supporting or Featured Actor in a Play	Best Performance by a Supporting or Featured Actress in a Play
**Walter Matthau – A Shot in the Dark as Benjamin Beaurevers**; Godfrey M. Cambridge – Purlie Victorious as Gitlow Judson; Joseph Campanella – A Gift of Time as Daniel Stein; Paul Sparer – Ross as Auda Abu Tayi	**Elizabeth Ashley – Take Her, She's Mine as Mollie Michaelson**; Zohra Lampert – Look We've Come Through as Jennifer Lewison; Janet Margolin – Daughter of Silence as Anna Albertini; Pat Stanley – Sunday in New York as Eileen Taylor
Best Performance by a Supporting or Featured Actor in a Musical	Best Performance by a Supporting or Featured Actress in a Musical
**Charles Nelson Reilly – How to Succeed in Business Without Really Trying as Bud Frump**; Orson Bean – Subways Are for Sleeping as Charlie Smith; Severn Darden – From the Second City as Performer; Pierre Olaf – Carnival! as Jacquot	**Phyllis Newman – Subways Are for Sleeping as Martha Vail**; Elizabeth Allen – The Gay Life as Magda; Barbara Harris – From the Second City as Various Characters; Barbra Streisand – I Can Get It for You Wholesale as Miss Marmelstein
Best Direction of a Play	Best Direction of a Musical
**Noel Willman – A Man for All Seasons**; Tyrone Guthrie – Gideon; Donald McWhinie – The Caretaker; José Quintero – Great Day in the Morning	**Abe Burrows – How to Succeed in Business Without Really Trying**; Gower Champion – Carnival!; Joe Layton – No Strings; Joshua Logan – All American
Best Choreography	Best Conductor and Musical Director
**Agnes de Mille – Kwamina**; **Joe Layton – No Strings**; Michael Kidd – Subways Are for Sleeping; Dania Krupska – The Happiest Girl in the World	**Elliot Lawrence – How to Succeed in Business Without Really Trying**; Pembroke Davenport – Kean; Herbert Greene – The Gay Life; Peter Matz – No Strings
Best Scenic Design	Best Costume Design
**Will Steven Armstrong – Carnival!**; Rouben Ter-Arutunian – A Passage to India; David Hays – No Strings; Oliver Smith – The Gay Life	**Lucinda Ballard – The Gay Life**; Donald Brooks – No Strings; Motley – Kwamina; Miles White – Milk and Honey

=== Multiple nominations and awards ===
These productions had multiple nominations:

- 9 nominations: No Strings
- 8 nominations: How to Succeed in Business Without Really Trying
- 7 nominations: Carnival!
- 5 nominations: Milk and Honey
- 4 nominations: The Gay Life, Gideon, A Man for All Seasons and Ross
- 3 nominations: The Caretaker, The Night of the Iguana, Kwamina and Subways Are for Sleeping
- 2 nominations: All American, From the Second City, Great Day in the Morning, Kean, A Passage to India and Sail Away

The following productions received multiple awards.

- 7 wins: How to Succeed in Business Without Really Trying
- 4 wins: A Man for All Seasons
- 3 wins: No Strings
- 2 wins: Carnival!

== See also ==
- 34th Academy Awards
