= 3rd Tony Awards =

1949 US theatrical awards ceremony

- Date: April 24, 1949
- Location: Waldorf-Astoria Hotel; New York City, New York
- Hosted by: Brock Pemberton, James Sauter
- Most wins: Death of a Salesman (6)

Television/radio coverage
- Network: WOR, Mutual Network

The 3rd Annual Tony Awards were held on April 24, 1949, at the Waldorf-Astoria Grand Ballroom in New York City, and broadcast on radio station WOR and the Mutual Network. The Masters of Ceremonies were Brock Pemberton and James Sauter.

== Ceremony ==
The silver Tony medallion, designed by Herman Rosse, was awarded for the first time. The face of the medallion portrayed an adaptation of the comedy and tragedy masks and the reverse side had a relief profile of Antoinette Perry.

Performers: Yvonne Adair, Anne Renee Anderson, Carol Channing, Alfred Drake, Bill Eythe, Nanette Fabray, Jane Froman, Lisa Kirk, Mary McCarty, Lucy Monroe, Gene Nelson, Lanny Ross, Lee Stacy, Lawrence Tibbett, Betty Jane Watson, and Paul Winchell.

The American Theatre Wing "emphasized that it avoids any 'firsts' or 'bests' and presents the prizes for a 'notable contribution to the current season'.... Anything that enlivens the theatre may win a 'Tony'". South Pacific, which had won the Critics' Circle Award, was not eligible for these Tony Awards, which were confined to productions opening up to March 1, 1949. It was eligible for the following year.

== Award winners ==
Note: nominees not shown

=== Production ===
Award	Winner
Best Play	Death of a Salesman by Arthur Miller
Best Musical	Kiss Me, Kate Music and lyrics by Cole Porter, book by Bella and Samuel Spewack
Best Author (Play)	Arthur Miller, Death of a Salesman
Best Author (Musical)	Bella Spewack and Samuel Spewack, Kiss Me, Kate
Tony Award for Producers (Dramatic)	Kermit Bloomgarden and Walter Fried, Death of a Salesman
Tony Award for Producers (Musical)	Saint Subber and Lemuel Ayers, Kiss Me, Kate

=== Performance ===
Award	Winner
Actor-Play	Rex Harrison, Anne of the Thousand Days
Actress-Play	Martita Hunt, The Madwoman of Chaillot
Actor-Musical	Ray Bolger, Where's Charley?
Actress-Musical	Nanette Fabray, Love Life
Tony Award for Actor, Supporting or Featured	Arthur Kennedy, Death of a Salesman
Tony Award for Actress, Supporting or Featured	Shirley Booth, Goodbye, My Fancy

=== Craft ===
Award	Winner
Best Director	Elia Kazan, Death of a Salesman
Tony Award for Composer and Lyricist	Cole Porter, Kiss Me, Kate
Choreographer	Gower Champion, Lend an Ear
Costume Designer	Lemuel Ayers, Kiss Me, Kate
Scenic Designer	Jo Mielziner, Sleepy Hollow / Summer and Smoke / Anne of the Thousand Days / Death of a Salesman / South Pacific
Conductor and Musical Director	Max Meth, As the Girls Go

=== Multiple nominations and awards ===
The following productions received multiple awards.

- 6 wins: Death of a Salesman
- 5 wins: Kiss Me, Kate
- 2 wins: Anne of the Thousand Days

== See also ==
- 21st Academy Awards
