= Shubert Theatre (New Haven) =

Theatre in New Haven, Connecticut

- The Shubert
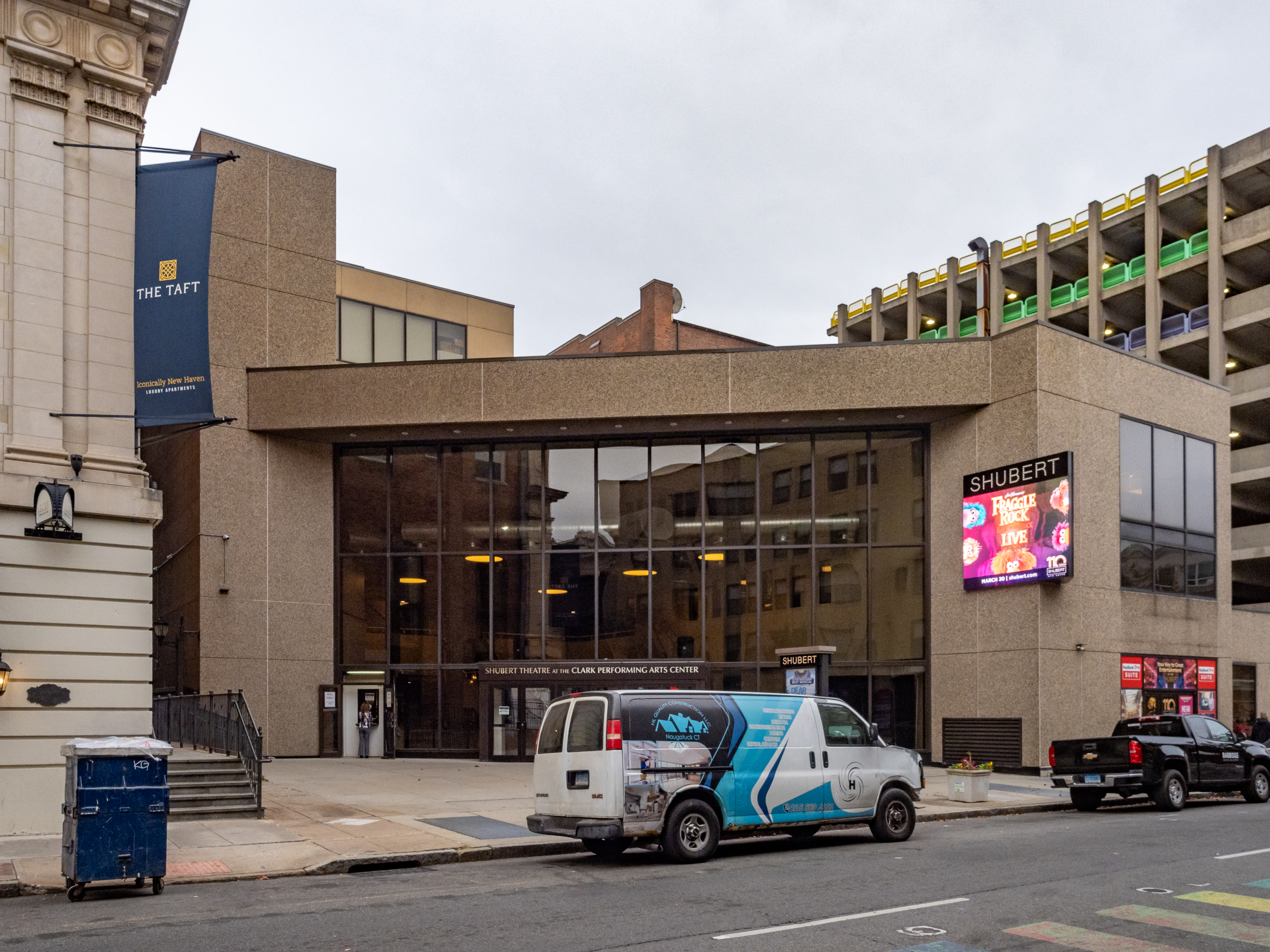
- (2024)
- Interactive map of Shubert Theatre
- Address: 247 College Street; New Haven, Connecticut; United States
- Coordinates: 41°18′23.5″N 72°55′44.6″W
- Owner: (1914–1941) The Shubert Organization; (1941–1978) Morris Nunes and Maurice Bailey; (1983–2013) City of New Haven; (2013–present) CAPA
- Operator: CAPA
- Capacity: 1,600
- Current use: Theatre and entertainment venue

Construction
- Opened: 1914; 112 years ago
- Closed: 1978
- Reopened: 1983
- Architect: Albert Swazey

Website
- www.shubert.com

The Shubert Theatre is a 1,600-seat theatre located at 247 College Street in New Haven, Connecticut. It is currently operated as a non-profit organization by the Columbus Association for the Performing Arts (CAPA).

== History ==
Originally opened in 1914 by The Shubert Organization, it was designed by Albert Swazey, a New York architect and built by the H.E. Murdock Construction Company.

The theater struggled financially in the 1970's and closed in 1976. The theater building was subsequently acquired by the City of New Haven, and the interior was restored. The Adams Hotel, which was located between the historic theater building and College Street, was demolished to build a modern lobby addition. The theatre reopened under city ownership in 1983, operated by the Columbus Association for the Performing Arts (CAPA).

== Notable productions ==
For decades, the Shubert was used as a tryout venue for plays and musicals that, if successful, would then move on to Broadway — sometimes with an intermediate stop in Boston or Philadelphia. It has hosted more than 600 out-of-town tryouts, including more than 300 world premieres and more than 50 American premieres. In recent decades, however, the Shubert has been more likely to host shows after their Broadway run rather than before.

Plays that fail to make it to Broadway are the origin of the phrase "bombed in New Haven," which inspired the Joseph Heller play We Bombed in New Haven.

Notable actors and other performers who played the Shubert include Marlon Brando, Gregory Peck, Henry Fonda, Julie Andrews, the Marx Brothers, Sidney Poitier, Humphrey Bogart, Spencer Tracy, Katharine Hepburn, Jimmy Stewart, Clark Gable, Gene Kelly, Robert Redford, Warren Beatty, Shirley MacLaine, Andy Griffith, Jane Fonda, James Earl Jones, Louis Armstrong, Ella Fitzgerald, Duke Ellington, Buddy Rich, Liza Minnelli, Robert Guillaume, John Travolta, Anna Pavlova, Martha Graham, Beverly Sills, Efrem Zimbalist, Mandy Patinkin, Harry Belafonte, Ruby Dee, Ethel Merman, Carol Burnett, Yul Brynner, Zero Mostel, James Garner, Sergei Rachmaninoff, Jessica Tandy, Lee Remick, Nancy Reagan, Mary Martin, Rex Harrison, Julie Harris, Nanette Fabray, Vaslav Nijinsky, Ray Walston, Alfred Drake, Barbara Cook, Celeste Holm, Ezio Pinza, Gertrude Lawrence, John Raitt, Judy Holliday, Lisa Kirk, Sophie Tucker, and William Gaxton.

Pre-Broadway engagements at the Shubert:

- 1916: Robinson Crusoe, Jr.
- 1919: Oh, What A Girl! (performed at the Shubert under the title The Wrong Number)
- 1921: Dulcy
- 1922: Seventh Heaven
- 1923: Stepping Stones
- 1925: The Vagabond King
- 1926: The Desert Song
- 1927: A Connecticut Yankee
- 1928: Street Scene
- 1930: Strike Up the Band
- 1931: The Barretts of Wimpole Street, The Wonder Bar, The Third Little Show, Of Thee I Sing
- 1932: Gay Divorce
- 1934: All the King's Horses, The Children's Hour
- 1935: Dead End
- 1936: Stage Door, Red, Hot and Blue
- 1937: Room Service
- 1938: I Married an Angel, Leave It to Me!, The Boys From Syracuse
- 1939: Stars in Your Eyes, Too Many Girls, Du Barry Was a Lady
- 1940: Louisiana Purchase, Panama Hattie
- 1941: Blithe Spirit, Best Foot Forward, Sunny River
- 1943: Oklahoma! (then titled Away We Go)
- 1944: The Cherry Orchard, Follow the Girls
- 1945: Carousel, Marinka, The Secret Room, The Girl From Nantucket, The Day Before Spring, Billion Dollar Baby, Lute Song
- 1946: St. Louis Woman, Annie Get Your Gun, Shootin' Star, Windy City, Around the World, Sweet Bye and Bye, Come On Up
- 1947: Barefoot Boy With Cheek, Allegro, A Streetcar Named Desire
- 1948: Mister Roberts, My Romance, Sleepy Hollow, Love Life, As the Girls Go, Along Fifth Avenue
- 1949: South Pacific, Regina
- 1950: Texas, Li'l Darlin', Great to Be Alive, Call Me Madam, Bless You All
- 1951: The King and I, A Tree Grows in Brooklyn, Flahooley, Remains to Be Seen, Pal Joey; Billy Budd
- 1952: Three Wishes for Jamie, Of Thee I Sing, Shuffle Along
- 1953: Wonderful Town, Maggie, Tea and Sympathy, The Teahouse of the August Moon, Sabrina Fair, The Caine Mutiny Court-Martial
- 1954: By the Beautiful Sea, The Pajama Game, Hit the Trail, Plain and Fancy
- 1955: The Desperate Hours, Ankles Aweigh, Damn Yankees, No Time for Sergeants, The Vamp (then titled Delilah), Pipe Dream
- 1956: My Fair Lady, Strip For Action, Shangri-La, Long Day's Journey into Night, Bells Are Ringing, Candide
- 1957: New Girl in Town, Copper and Brass
- 1958: A Touch of the Poet, Redhead
- 1959: The Sound of Music, Fiorello!
- 1960: From A to Z, Lock Up Your Daughters, Tenderloin, Advise and Consent, Period of Adjustment, The Conquering Hero, Show Girl
- 1961: The Happiest Girl in the World, Milk and Honey
- 1962: We Take the Town, No Strings, A Funny Thing Happened on the Way to the Forum
- 1963: She Loves Me, Barefoot in the Park, One Flew Over the Cuckoo's Nest
- 1964: High Spirits, Dylan, Fade Out - Fade In, Awf'lly Nice, Royal Flush
- 1965: Do I Hear a Waltz?, The Roar of the Greasepaint - The Smell of the Crowd, Flora the Red Menace, The Yearling, Wait Until Dark
- 1966: The Star-Spangled Girl
- 1967: How Now, Dow Jones
- 1968: Plaza Suite, I'm Solomon, A Mother's Kisses, Zorba
- 1969: 1776, Last of the Red Hot Lovers
- 1970: Georgy, Cry for Us All, Two By Two, The Gingerbread Lady
- 1971: The Prisoner of Second Avenue
- 1972: The Sunshine Boys
- 1974: God's Favorite
- 1976: Annie Get Your Gun, Something Old, Something New (the Shubert's last production for more than seven years)
- 1995: Jekyll & Hyde
- 1997: Proposals (the first original play to tryout at the Shubert since the reopening)
- 1999: The Civil War
- 2001: The Adventures of Tom Sawyer
