= Cast recording =

Recording of a stage musical by the cast

A cast recording is a recording of a stage musical that is intended to document the songs performed in a show. An original cast recording (OCR) features the voices of the show's original cast. A cast recording featuring the first cast to perform a musical in a particular venue is known, for example, as an "original Broadway cast recording" (OBCR) or an "original London cast recording" (OLCR).

Cast recordings are (usually) studio recordings rather than live recordings. The recorded song lyrics and orchestrations are nonetheless identical (or very similar) to those of the songs as performed in the theatre. Like any studio performance, the recording is an idealized rendering, without audible audience reaction.

== History ==
The British were the first to create cast recordings, and they were also the first to create original London cast recordings of shows that had already opened on Broadway, but had not been recorded with their original Broadway cast. This led to the odd situation of having, for example, a 1928 recording of the London cast of Show Boat, but no recording with the actual 1927 Broadway cast, and a recording of the London cast of Sigmund Romberg's The Desert Song, but not of the 1926 Broadway cast - even though both of these shows are Broadway musicals, rather than British ones.

Prior to the development of original cast recordings, there had been recordings of songs from musicals, and collections of several such songs, and recordings of songs performed by cast members; but they were recordings of songs, that is, they were recorded as stand-alone show tunes rather than representations of a (more or less) complete musical.

The first American original cast recording as we know it was an early experimental LP of program transcriptions of selections from The Band Wagon, a 1931 revue starring Fred and Adele Astaire. It was not widely released.

The following year, Jack Kapp produced an album of songs from Show Boat timed to the 1932 Ziegfeld revival. This album featured Helen Morgan and Paul Robeson doing their songs from the show but used studio cast singers for the leads.

As the 1930s progressed, Liberty Music Shop in New York City made mini albums of songs from the Ethel Merman musical comedies Red Hot and Blue and Stars in Your Eyes. These were more like personality recordings, since the arrangements were not the ones heard in the theatre.

The first complete so-called original cast album was Marc Blitzstein's 1938 album of songs from The Cradle Will Rock although these were recorded with just piano accompaniment and not the show's orchestra. In 1984, the original recordings from Very Warm for May (1939) were discovered and issued on an LP. However, these recordings were not made with the original orchestrations.

RCA Victor had made an album of the key songs from Porgy and Bess using the theatre orchestra but featuring Met opera singers Lawrence Tibbett and Helen Jepson singing the songs. Decca riposted with another album of the same highlights sung by the actual stars of the original production, although recorded five years after the premiere. When a revival was staged in 1942, Decca issued a second album of some of the secondary songs from the opera by the revival cast and later combined these two albums onto one LP and called it the "original cast recording". Decca also issued an album of songs from the all-soldier revue This Is the Army by Irving Berlin.

Finally in 1943, came Decca's recording of Oklahoma!. It not only featured the original cast, but the show's original chorus, all accompanied by the same orchestra heard in the show, playing the music in the original Robert Russell Bennett orchestrations and conducted by the show's original conductor, Jay Blackton. The show was the biggest hit Broadway had experienced up until that time and people who could not get tickets bought the album. It would eventually sell over 1 million copies as a set of 78-rpm records, and millions more on LP and Compact Discs.

Decca soon began recording every hit musical that came along including One Touch of Venus, Carmen Jones, Carousel, and Annie Get Your Gun. Soon, all the other record companies were bidding for the rights to record Broadway shows with their original casts.

Capitol recorded St. Louis Woman in 1946, and RCA Victor recorded Brigadoon in 1947. Although Decca abandoned the cast album field in the mid-1950s, Capitol and Victor actively bid for recording rights. Sometimes problems arose as when RCA Victor signed on to record the 1950 musical Call Me Madam even though the show's star, Ethel Merman was then under exclusive contract to Decca Records. This resulted in two albums of the score being released: Merman with a studio cast on her label, while the rest of the Broadway cast made an album for RCA Victor with Dinah Shore singing the Merman role.

The label that would dominate the field until the late 1970s, however, was Columbia. They began by issuing an album of the 1946 revival of Show Boat followed by the original Broadway cast of Finian's Rainbow in 1947. A year later the label introduced LP records and used the format for two best sellers: Kiss Me, Kate and South Pacific, both recorded and released in 1949.

Under the leadership of Columbia's Goddard Lieberson, the label's cast recordings came to define the genre. Columbia Masterworks produced the original cast recordings of such shows as The Pajama Game, My Fair Lady, The Sound of Music, West Side Story, Gypsy, and Camelot. Lieberson also recorded important shows that had failed at the box office including Candide and Anyone Can Whistle. In 1956, he recorded Frank Loesser's musical The Most Happy Fella, which had so much music that it had to be released as a 3-LP set, an almost unheard of venture for an original cast album in the 1950s.

A 1970 documentary by D. A. Pennebaker, Original Cast Album: Company gives a straightforward view of the making of a cast recording. It shows how the recording studio looks, how performers are arranged, and how the director behaves. The cast feels the pressure of delivering a definitive performance, with a degree of perfection beyond that ever required on stage, under a time limit imposed by the high cost of studio time.

Throughout the 1950s and 1960s it was not uncommon for cast albums to become best sellers. My Fair Lady, The Music Man, Funny Girl, and Hello, Dolly! all reached the #1 position on the Billboard magazine best-sellers chart. As popular music split away from the traditional Tin Pan Alley song stylings of Broadway and Hollywood, and rock music became the dominant pop culture form, show albums began selling less well, albeit with exceptions like the rock musical Hair, which as of January 2024 is the last cast album to chart at No. 1 on the Billboard 200. (The cast albums for The Book of Mormon and Hamilton both peaked at No. 3.) Also, as radio and TV moved away from showcasing Broadway numbers the ability for a show to reach an audience beyond the traditional Broadway fans lessened.

in the 21st century, few musical theatre cast albums place on the billboard 200,and standard radio stations rarely broadcast contemporary show tunes.

New boutique labels such as PS Classics and Ghostlight release many of the cast albums of recent Broadway hits. With the recent merger of Sony Music (formerly Columbia Records) and BMG Music (formerly RCA Victor), many older editions of cast recordings are being deleted and newly remastered editions are being released.

== Technical limitations ==
A 10-inch 78-rpm disc could hold about 3 1/2 minutes of music per side. A 12-inch 78-rpm could last 4 1/2 minutes. Early albums had to severely abridge selections to fit the format. With LP cast recordings, usually released as single discs, it was not rare for compromises to be made to fit the recording within the forty-to-fifty-minute time limit. For example, reprises, or minor songs might not be included.

By the 1980s, the rise of the compact disc with its 74-minute recording capacity (which was increased to 80 minutes in the 1990s) resulted in improvements in cast recordings, which were now usually capable of including all songs, the full overture and entr'acte, and, when appropriate, lead-in dialogue to the songs.

In recent years, some cast recordings have been recorded live, in recording studios incorporated into the theater concerned. Otherwise, live recordings tend to trade sound quality for freshness and immediacy.

== Alternate versions ==
It is often the case that many cast recordings may be made for the same show. In addition to the recording of the cast of the original production, later high-profile productions may also produce cast recordings: for example, a recording by the cast of the first London production of a show that originated on Broadway, or of the first Broadway cast of a show that originated off-Broadway, or of the cast of a revival produced many decades later than the original production.

For some musicals created before cast recordings became the norm, studio cast recordings are all that exist to document the original productions' orchestrations. Such studio cast recordings have been made of many early musical comedies by the Gershwins (George Gershwin and Ira Gershwin), Vincent Youmans, and Rodgers and Hart.

== Terms ==
Original cast: the premiere or original cast of the production (original Broadway cast; original London cast; original Toronto cast; original Australian cast, etc.). This can (rather confusingly) include revivals as well as first productions. Less misleading in this last case is "Revival Cast".

Studio cast: assembled by a record company. In the early days, the studio cast singers were often lesser known performers with good singing voices, usually joined by one fairly well known star. Mary Martin made a number of studio cast recordings for Columbia in the early 1950s including Babes in Arms, Girl Crazy, and Anything Goes. More recent studio albums have tended to be note-complete recreations of the original orchestrations, often with well-known singers (not infrequently from the world of opera rather than musical theatre) taking the leads: such as EMI's recordings of Brigadoon and Show Boat.

The performers who appear in Broadway shows sing the score live each night. When a Broadway cast album is made, it is (as a rule) recorded in a studio and produced with the home listener in mind (although live recordings of the original cast are not unknown). While it is strictly correct (if misleading) to call a movie soundtrack a "cast recording" since it does record the performances of the film cast, it is even more misleading, not to mention incorrect, to call any recording a "soundtrack" that has no connection with a motion picture or recorded television production.

Soundtrack albums fill a very similar function for films with music. Soundtrack and cast albums sometimes have much in common, especially when the film concerned is a motion picture version of an original stage musical, and it often makes sense for record shops to put the two genres in the same section. But the cast album of a stage musical is very specifically not a soundtrack.

== Major label cast albums ==
=== Decca ===
Decca Broadway, known from the 1940s until the 1990s simply as Decca Records, is the label that began the trend in North America. They released 78-rpm album sets of Porgy and Bess, Oklahoma!, A Connecticut Yankee, One Touch of Venus, Carmen Jones, Bloomer Girl, Song of Norway, Carousel, Annie Get Your Gun, Call Me Mister, and Lost in the Stars. Many of these were transferred to LP in 1949–1950 although sometimes songs were abridged or left out completely. The label added more titles to their cast album library in the early 1950s: Guys and Dolls, The King and I, Wonderful Town, Seventh Heaven, On Your Toes, and Anchors Aweigh. In 1968, Decca issued a 2-LP set of the London cast of Man of La Mancha, an album which featured almost the complete show (the Broadway cast album had been recorded by Kapp Records).

In 1949, Decca began to re-release the best-selling of these albums on LP and in the late 1950s began offer electronically enhanced for stereo editions.

The label was out of the business of recording new cast albums by the end of the 1950s. Decca was bought by MCA and in the early 1970s many of these titles were re-released on the MCA label, all using the fake stereo masters.

MCA released many of their classic shows on CD in the 1990s, going back to original master discs and tapes to generate excellent sounding (and complete) remasters of the originals. When MCA and Polygram were merged into the new Universal Music Group, a new label, Decca Broadway, was born. Decca Broadway has re-mastered and reissued virtually every cast album in the old Decca catalogue including many rare titles that had not been available in almost 50 years. Decca Broadway has also recorded recent hits including: Wicked, Monty Python's Spamalot, Seussical, and Spring Awakening. It has not, however, released the London cast album of Man of La Mancha on CD, perhaps because it contains most of the dialogue from the show, and the film version is readily available on DVD. Wicked, in particular has been a big seller for the label and continues to sell well. Although they are being selective about what they record, Decca Broadway plans to continue making cast albums, including the Mel Brooks musical Young Frankenstein and Andrew Lippa's The Addams Family: A New Musical. Although some of the slower-selling catalog titles have been deleted, many remain available as downloads.

=== Capitol ===
Capitol recorded St. Louis Woman in 1946, mainly because lyricist Johnny Mercer was one of the label's founders. It wasn't until the 1950s, however, that the label began bidding for cast album rights. Their first few choices were generally not big hits: Flahooley, Top Banana, Three Wishes for Jamie, and the revival of Of Thee I Sing. They finally got a hit show in 1953 with Cole Porter's Can-Can, which remained in print until the end of the LP era. Recordings featuring the film casts of three Rodgers and Hammerstein films (Oklahoma!, Carousel, and The King and I) were also released on Capitol during the 1950s, all earning RIAA gold record awards. An even bigger hit came along in 1957 with The Music Man, which reached the #1 spot on the Billboard charts and stayed there for 12 weeks. It was also the label's first stereo cast album. They scored another bestseller in 1964 when Barbra Streisand's label Columbia Records passed on recording Funny Girl. Capitol recorded it, and the album became a million seller. Without a TV/radio network affiliation (such as Columbia had with CBS and RCA with NBC) Capitol sometimes had to content themselves with "also-ran" shows. The 1960s found them with recording rights to a number of minor hits: No Strings, The Unsinkable Molly Brown, and Golden Boy but mostly they got flop shows: Sail Away, Kwamina, The Gay Life, Skyscraper, Walking Happy, and Zorba. They did record Stephen Sondheim's Broadway debut as a composer with A Funny Thing Happened on the Way to the Forum, but in 1971 they came under fire for refusing to record the complete score of Sondheim's Follies as a 2-LP set. The label executives complained that "cast albums don't sell" ignoring the ongoing success of Funny Girl and The Music Man and the fact that many of their shows had been outright flops. Follies was truncated to a single LP missing four songs and abridging many of the others. It would be Capitol's last original cast album.

EMI's classical division took over the Capitol Broadway cast catalogue in 1992 and reissued all 40 of the cast albums on the Broadway Angel label. The CDs were well packaged with booklets containing detailed notes and production photos. Although only a half dozen of these releases are still in print as of October 2007, most of the deleted titles have been reissued by DRG keeping the scores available for collectors.

Broadway Angel has recorded some recent shows such as: Crazy for You, Passion, The Color Purple, and Curtains, the 1994 Broadway revival of Carousel, as well as the Bernadette Peters revivals of Annie Get Your Gun and Gypsy.

In 2013, Universal Music Group acquired EMI and with it Angel and Capitol Broadway catalogues.

=== RCA Victor ===
RCA Victor entered the cast album field in 1947 with two hits and a miss: Brigadoon, High Button Shoes, and Rodgers & Hammerstein's Allegro. Brigadoon was a big seller and remains in print on CD today. High Button Shoes was a hit show but the album did not do well. RCA's budget label, Camden, reissued it on LP in 1958 and Victor re-released it in 1965. At that time they also did the first LP transfer of Allegro.

As the LP era dawned, Victor competed with Columbia for cast album rights. Their first LP release was Irving Berlin's Call Me Madam but because the star Ethel Merman was under contract to Decca, she was replaced on Victor's album by Dinah Shore. The album was a failure and was out of print until Red Seal reissued it in 1977. Victor did better with Paint Your Wagon, and Damn Yankees, but had their share of flops: Seventeen, Make a Wish, Hazel Flagg, and Pipe Dream, along with minor hits Me and Juliet, Happy Hunting, New Girl in Town, Jamaica, Redhead, Take Me Along, Do Re Mi, Wildcat, and Milk and Honey.

In the 1960s, Victor did better with the Tony Award winners How to Succeed in Business Without Really Trying, Hello, Dolly!, and Fiddler on the Roof. They hit the top of the charts with Hair in 1968. During this time it also released five of the cast albums from the Music Theatre of Lincoln Center revivals, The Merry Widow with Patrice Munsel, Show Boat with Barbara Cook, Constance Towers, Stephen Douglass, David Wayne, and William Warfield, Kismet with Alfred Drake, Annie Get Your Gun with Ethel Merman, Carousel with John Raitt, and The King and I with Rise Stevens and Darren McGavin.

In 1976, Thomas Z. Shepard left Columbia Records for RCA's Classical division and under his guidance RCA Red Seal eclipsed Columbia as the dominant label for cast albums. Shepard recorded Sondheim's scores for Pacific Overtures, Sweeney Todd, Sunday in the Park With George, and Merrily We Roll Along, the 1977 Broadway revival recording of The King and I, as well as the hits Ain't Misbehavin', 42nd Street, and La Cage aux Folles.

In 1985, Shepard staged an all-star concert to make a complete recording of Sondheim's Follies. When pre-production costs escalated, label president Jose Menendez wanted to cancel the recording. Shepard held his ground and won the battle. The 2-LP set was a bestseller and made profit within a month of release. Early in 1986 Shepard resigned and went to MCA.

With the rise of compact discs in the late 1980s, RCA was bought out by BMG. At this time Bill Rosenfield used RCA Victor to re-release the label's vast catalogue of show albums on CD and to record new shows including: Into The Woods, Jerome Robbins' Broadway, Grand Hotel, Kiss of the Spider Woman, Titanic, Steel Pier, Ragtime, Fosse, The Full Monty, Thoroughly Modern Millie, Urinetown, and Avenue Q. During this time RCA Victor also released the cast recordings for the Broadway revivals of Anything Goes (1987), Guys and Dolls (1992), Chicago (1996), Candide (1997), Cabaret (1998), The Sound of Music (1998), You're a Good Man, Charlie Brown (1999), and Man of La Mancha (2002).

Many of the older, more obscure titles were deleted in 1999–2000 but the catalogue remains active. The merger between Sony and BMG in 2004 has resulted in a new label called Masterworks Broadway and now that Sony has taken over the entire operation they have started allowing outside companies such as DRG to re-release many of the rarer cast albums from the combined Columbia and RCA Victor catalogues.

=== Columbia ===
Columbia's first original Broadway cast album was the 1946 revival of Show Boat, soon followed by an album of Finian's Rainbow. In 1948 Columbia introduced the Lp to the record market and soon offered LP editions of their 78-rpm sets. The first cast album recorded as an LP was Cole Porter's Kiss Me, Kate, which was a big hit on records and was followed by the blockbuster Rodgers and Hammerstein musical South Pacific. The producer of these albums was Goddard Lieberson, who brought unquestionable taste and skill to translating a Broadway show to records. He didn't just record the songs. It was his goal to make the album an enjoyable listening experience for home listeners who, quite often, had not even seen the shows. Recorded in an old converted church on 30th street in New York City, Columbia's albums had a lush, open, spacious sound. When stereo came along in the late 1950s, Lieberson used stereo placement to enhance the performances but avoided any gimmicks. As a result, Columbia's albums of Kismet, The Pajama Game, Bells Are Ringing, and Flower Drum Song remain classics in the field.

In 1956, Lieberson persuaded CBS to put up the entire capitalization for Lerner and Loewe's My Fair Lady. This ensured that Columbia got the cast album rights and that CBS held all film and TV rights to the property. The show was the biggest hit of the decade, selling out for nearly 6 years on Broadway. The original cast album reached #1 on the Billboard charts, and stayed on the charts for nine years. Because the Broadway cast had been recorded only in monaural, when the cast opened it in London Columbia re-recorded it in stereo. The label later offered the film soundtrack and a 1976 20th anniversary revival cast albums as well as recordings in French, Italian, Spanish and Hebrew.

The profits from the My Fair Lady album financed many of Columbia's subsequent original cast and classical recordings.

The label recorded Frank Loesser's near sung-through musical The Most Happy Fella, virtually complete and issued it as a 3-record set as well as a single Lp of highlights. Lieberson made sure that important scores were recorded even if the shows were not box office successes. Thanks to his foresight the original casts of Candide, Anyone Can Whistle, and Goldilocks are preserved.

Columbia recorded as many hits as they did flops - Gypsy, The Sound of Music, Bye Bye Birdie, Camelot, Sweet Charity, Mame, 1776, Cabaret, West Side Story, Company, A Little Night Music, and Annie.

In the 1980s, the label began to withdraw from the cast album field as RCA began to dominate it. Sony bought CBS records in the late 1980s and began reissuing many older cast albums on the Sony Broadway label in 1991–94 and later the Sony Columbia Broadway Masterworks labels. The few, mainly obscure flops, that Sony chose not to reissue were farmed out to DRG and other specialty labels.

The merger between Sony and BMG in 2004 has resulted in a new label called Masterworks Broadway and now that Sony has taken over the entire operation they have started allowing outside companies such as DRG to re-release many of the rarer cast albums from the combined Columbia and RCA Victor catalogues. Masterworks Broadway has also launched a new website offering the combined Victor and Columbia catalogues.

== Other labels ==
ABC – This label was active in the cast album field in the 1960s. It was bought by MCA and is now owned by Universal Music Group.

Disney Records - Produces cast recordings for the stage adaptations of Disney films Beauty and the Beast, The Lion King, Tarzan, Mary Poppins, Newsies, The Little Mermaid, Aladdin, Frozen, and Hercules.

DRG – Hugh Fordin's Discovery Record Group records Broadway cast albums and Cabaret performances. Recently the label has reissued a number of out-of-print cast albums from the Capitol, Columbia, and RCA Victor catalogues.

David Serero Records - the French baritone produced and arranged on his own label the only Broadway musical by Duke Ellington: Beggar's Holiday. Serero has since arranged and produced other recordings, including "I Wish You L.O.V.E" by Jermaine Jackson from his one-man musical called You Are Not Alone.

Fynsworth Alley – Although now defunct, the label reissued some Columbia albums and recorded some solo artists.

JAY Records - A studio and original cast recording label. JAY produces recordings of both studio and stage casts. They operate a Masterworks edition section in which top-class two-disc complete recordings of classic Broadway musical scores are produced featuring well-known opera singers and musical theatre singers. The King and I, Calamity Jane, Guys and Dolls, Annie Get Your Gun, and My Fair Lady (which won a Grammy Award) have all been produced on the Masterworks edition label.

Kapp – an MCA label now owned by Universal. Their most famous Broadway album is the 1965 original cast recording of Man of La Mancha, starring Richard Kiley and Joan Diener. It remains a bestselling classic to this day and is currently available from Decca Broadway Records.

Original Cast - Founded by Bruce and Doris Yeko in 1975, this label specialises in recordings of obscure theatrical productions that would not otherwise get the chance to be commercially recorded. The label's output has included original cast and studio cast albums of notorious Broadway flops, recordings of lesser-known off-Broadway and off-off-Broadway shows, and the commercial release of privately made theatre-related recordings (such as composer's demos) .

Polydor – Part of the Polygram group that includes London (U.S. label for British Decca), Deutsche Grammophon and Philips. Polydor released a few show CDs under license from John Yap's TER label in UK but these were quickly deleted. Polydor also released many of the cast recordings from the Andrew Lloyd Webber musicals through the Really Useful Records label. Polygram merged with MCA to form Universal Music Group, and many of the cast recordings that Polydor has released are released in the US on the Decca Broadway label.

Geffen - Although Geffen is a pop label, it released the cast recordings for five shows of which David Geffen was an investor. It released the original off-Broadway cast recording and the film soundtrack of Little Shop of Horrors, the original Broadway cast recordings of Dreamgirls, Les Misérables, and Cats. Geffen also released the London cast recordings of Cats and Miss Saigon in the USA. Now almost all of the Geffen cast albums are released through the Decca Broadway label.

PS Classics – A substantial catalogue of cast albums including Grey Gardens, A Year with Frog and Toad and the revivals of 110 in the Shade, Fiddler on the Roof, Company, Assassins, and Nine.

Sh-K-Boom Records and Ghostlight – Both are owned by Kurt Deutsch and Sherie Rene Scott. They have won three Grammy Awards for In the Heights, The Book of Mormon, and Beautiful: The Carole King Musical, and also released albums of Dirty Rotten Scoundrels, Legally Blonde: The Musical, The 25th Annual Putnam County Spelling Bee, Vanities, The Drowsy Chaperone, Everyday Rapture, Women on the Verge of a Nervous Breakdown, and the 2011 Broadway revival of Anything Goes.

SimG Records is an independent studio and original cast recording label dedicated to the promotion of new musical theatre. It is owned solely by London-based director/producer Simon Greiff in 2009. In 2014, SimG Records releases were nominated for seven Broadway World Album Awards. Original Cast Recordings include: Love Birds, Soho Cinders, Sleeping Arrangements, Ushers: The Front of House Musical, and A Spoonful of Sherman. Studio Cast Recordings include: Goldilocks and the Three Bears and The Three Little Pigs.

Stage Door Records - A UK-based reissue label that specialise in London and Broadway cast recordings and vocal albums, most never available on CD format before. Highlights from the Stage Door catalogue include the Original London cast albums of Colette and Mutiny! - both released on CD for the first time. Other cast albums include Napoleon, The Far Pavilions, Beautiful And Damned, and Out Of The Blue. Stage Door have also released best selling vocal albums on Twiggy, Anthony Newley, and Steve Barton.

Varèse Sarabande – Established as a label for movie scores, they did branch out into cast albums in the 1990s recording a number of Broadway and off-Broadway shows. The label has re-organized and is now focused on film scores only. Many of the Broadway shows have been deleted.

== See also ==
- Broadway theatre
- Goddard Lieberson
- List of musicals
- Musical theatre
