= Tony Award for Best Conductor and Musical Director =

Annual award for musicals and operas

- Awarded for: Best Conductor and Musical Director
- Location: United States New York City
- Presented by: American Theatre Wing The Broadway League
- Currently held by: Shepard Coleman for Hello, Dolly! (1964)
- Website: TonyAwards.com

The Tony Award for Best Conductor and Musical Director was awarded to acknowledge the contributions of conductors and musical directors in both musicals and operas. The award was first presented in 1948, and later discontinued after 1964.

== Winners and nominees ==
indicates the winner

=== 1940s ===
Year	Author	Production
1948; 2nd Tony Awards
1948; 2nd Tony Awards	Milton Rosenstock	Finian's Rainbow
1949; 3rd Tony Awards
1949; 3rd Tony Awards	Max Meth	As the Girls Go

=== 1950s ===
Year	Author	Production
1950; 4th Tony Awards
1950; 4th Tony Awards	Maurice Abravanel	Regina
1951; 5th Tony Awards
1951; 5th Tony Awards	Lehman Engel	The Consul
1952; 6th Tony Awards
1952; 6th Tony Awards	Max Meth	Pal Joey
1953; 7th Tony Awards
1953; 7th Tony Awards	Lehman Engel	Gilbert and Sullivan Season and Wonderful Town
1954; 8th Tony Awards
1954; 8th Tony Awards	Louis Adrian	Kismet
1955; 9th Tony Awards
1955; 9th Tony Awards	Thomas Schippers	The Saint of Bleecker Street
1956; 10th Tony Awards
1956; 10th Tony Awards	Hal Hastings	Damn Yankees
1956; 10th Tony Awards	Salvatore Dell'Isola	Pipe Dream
1956; 10th Tony Awards	Milton Rosenstock	The Vamp
1957; 11th Tony Awards
1957; 11th Tony Awards	Franz Allers	My Fair Lady
1957; 11th Tony Awards	Herbert Greene	The Most Happy Fella
1957; 11th Tony Awards	Samuel Krachmalnick	Candide
1958; 12th Tony Awards
1958; 12th Tony Awards	Herbert Greene	The Music Man
1958; 12th Tony Awards	Max Goberman	West Side Story
1959; 13th Tony Awards
1959; 13th Tony Awards	Salvatore Dell'Isola	Flower Drum Song
1959; 13th Tony Awards	Jay Blackton	Redhead
1959; 13th Tony Awards	Lehman Engel	Goldilocks
1959; 13th Tony Awards	Gershon Kingsley	La Plume de Ma Tante

=== 1960s ===
Year	Author	Production
1960; 14th Tony Awards
1960; 14th Tony Awards	Frederick Dvonch	The Sound of Music
1960; 14th Tony Awards	Abba Bogin	Greenwillow
1960; 14th Tony Awards	Lehman Engel	Take Me Along
1960; 14th Tony Awards	Hal Hastings	Fiorello!
1960; 14th Tony Awards	Milton Rosenstock	Gypsy
1961; 15th Tony Awards
1961; 15th Tony Awards	Franz Allers	Camelot
1961; 15th Tony Awards	Pembroke Davenport	13 Daughters
1961; 15th Tony Awards	Elliot Lawrence	Bye Bye Birdie
1961; 15th Tony Awards	Stanley Lebowsky	Irma La Douce
1962; 16th Tony Awards
1962; 16th Tony Awards	Elliot Lawrence	How to Succeed in Business Without Really Trying
1962; 16th Tony Awards	Pembroke Davenport	Kean
1962; 16th Tony Awards	Herbert Greene	The Gay Life
1962; 16th Tony Awards	Peter Matz	No Strings
1963; 17th Tony Awards
1963; 17th Tony Awards	Donald Pippin	Oliver!
1963; 17th Tony Awards	Jay Blackton	Mr. President
1963; 17th Tony Awards	Anton Coppola	Bravo Giovanni
1963; 17th Tony Awards	Julius Rudel	Brigadoon
1964; 18th Tony Awards
1964; 18th Tony Awards	Shepard Coleman	Hello, Dolly!
1964; 18th Tony Awards	Lehman Engel	What Makes Sammy Run?
1964; 18th Tony Awards	Charles Jaffe	West Side Story
1964; 18th Tony Awards	Fred Werner	High Spirits

== Award records ==
=== Multiple wins ===
2 Wins

- Franz Allers
- Lehman Engel
- Max Meth

=== Multiple nominations ===
5 Nominations

- Lehman Engel

3 Nominations

- Herbert Greene
- Milton Rosenstock

2 Nominations

- Franz Allers
- Jay Blackston
- Pembroke Davenport
- Salvatore Dell'Isola
- Hal Hastings
- Elliot Lawrence

== See also ==
- Drama Desk Award for Outstanding Orchestrations
- Tony Award for Best Orchestrations
- List of Tony Award-nominated productions
