= Franz Allers =

Music Conductor

- Born: March 11, 1905; Carlsbad, Austria-Hungary
- Died: January 26, 1995 (aged 89) Las Vegas, Nevada, U.S.
- Genres: Classical, Broadway, Operetta
- Occupation: Conductor
- Instruments: Violin, Conducting
- Years active: 1920s–1990s
- Award: Tony Award for Best Conductor and Musical Director (1957, 1961)

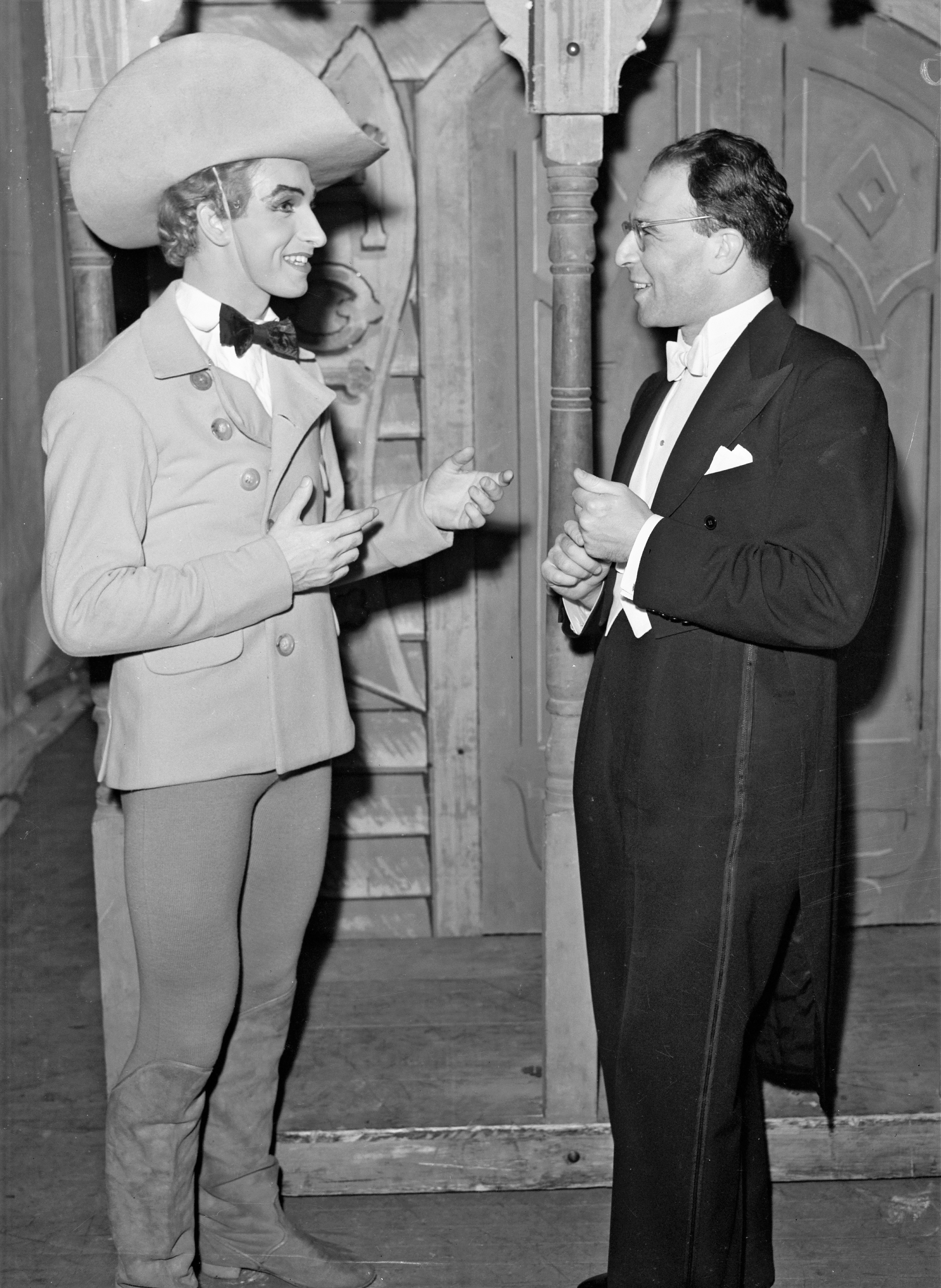
Allers (right) with dancer Frederic Franklin at the Ballet Russe de Monte Carlo performance of Ghost Town, Los Angeles, 1940

Franz Allers (August 6, 1905 - January 26, 1995) was an Austrian and American conductor of ballet, opera, Broadway musicals, film scores, and symphony orchestras.

== Early life ==
Franz Allers was born in Carlsbad, Austria-Hungary (now Czech Republic) in 1905. He started playing the violin at the age of 7. In 1920, he moved to Berlin, where he became a violinist in the Berlin Philharmonic. He had a distinguished career in Europe as an opera and symphonic conductor.

== Career ==
In 1947, Allers conducted the original Broadway production of Brigadoon. He conducted the original 1951 Broadway production of Paint Your Wagon. He was the music director for My Darlin' Aida the following year, and in 1954 he conducted the score for the animated film Hansel & Gretel. Allers conducted the score to the original Broadway production of My Fair Lady in 1957, and would go on to win the Tony Award for Best Conductor and Musical Director.

Allers received a nomination at the 1960 Grammy Awards in the category of Best Recording for Children for the film soundtrack of Hansel & Gretel. However, Allers lost out to Peter Ustinov's Peter & the Wolf (with Herbert von Karajan conducting the Philharmonia Orchestra).

In 1961, Allers conducted the original Broadway production of Camelot, which won him a second Tony Award for Best Conductor and Musical Director. On October 1, 1961, a German translation of My Fair Lady opened at the Theater des Westens in Berlin, conducted by Allers.

== Personal life ==
Allers moved to the United States in 1938. He met his first wife, singer Carolyn Shaffer, in Chicago in 1939. While working on Broadway, Allers, his wife and their daughter, Carol, lived in Riverdale, New York. In later life, he moved back to Germany and lived in Munich with his second wife, German actress/playwright Janne Furch-Allers (née Ertel). She died in 1992 at the age of 76.

In 1995, Allers died from complications from pneumonia at the Desert Springs Hospital in Las Vegas, Nevada while traveling to California. He was 89.

According to his New York Times obituary, "Allers, along with the conductor Maurice Abravanel, 'completely revised the standards of Broadway pit work,' demanding the highest quality from both the orchestra players and the singers."

== Awards and nominations ==
- 1957 Tony Award for Best Conductor and Musical Director – My Fair Lady
- 1960 Grammy Award nomination for Best Recording for Children – Hansel & Gretel
- 1961 Tony Award for Best Conductor and Musical Director – Camelot
