= Donovan's Reef =

1963 film by John Ford

- 1963 poster
- Directed by: John Ford
- Screenplay by: Frank S. Nugent; James Edward Grant
- Story by: Edmund Beloin
- Produced by: John Ford
- Starring: John Wayne; Lee Marvin; Elizabeth Allen; Jack Warden; Cesar Romero; Dick Foran; Dorothy Lamour
- Cinematography: William H. Clothier
- Edited by: Otho Lovering
- Music by: Cyril Mockridge
- Color process: Technicolor
- Production company: John Ford Productions
- Distributed by: Paramount Pictures
- Release date: June 12, 1963
- Running time: 109 minutes
- Country: United States
- Language: English
- Budget: $2,686,000
- Box office: $6,600,000

Donovan's Reef is a 1963 American adventure comedy film starring John Wayne and Lee Marvin. It was directed by John Ford and filmed in Kauai, Hawaii, but is set in French Polynesia.

The supporting cast features Elizabeth Allen, Jack Warden, Cesar Romero, Dick Foran, and Dorothy Lamour. The film marked the last time Ford and Wayne collaborated.

== Plot ==
Nearly two decades after World War II, Thomas Gilhooley, an expatriate United States Navy (USN) veteran, works on a freighter. Upon realizing that it will not stop at his destination, Haleakaloha, French Polynesia, he jumps ship to swim ashore.

Michael Donovan, another expatriate USN veteran and a former shipmate of Gilhooley's, remains a close friend of William "Doc" Dedham, also a USN veteran, and the only medical doctor in the archipelago. Dedham asks Donovan to care for his three children while he is away on a two-week circuit of the islands, providing medical care.

Gilhooley shares Donovan's birthday, and the two have a 21-year tradition of a fistfight every birthday, to the delight of the local observers. On this occasion, the two vets trash "Donovan's Reef," the saloon Donovan owns.

In Boston, Miss Amelia Dedham, a "proper" young lady "of means," becomes the chairman of the board of the Dedham Shipping Company. Her father, Doc Dedham (whom she has never met), has inherited the majority of stock in the family company. Amelia travels to Haleakaloha to find proof that Doc has violated an outdated (but still in effect) morality clause in the will, preventing him from inheriting the stock and enabling her to retain control.

While Doc is away, word is received that Miss Dedham will soon arrive. Fearing that Miss Dedham's Boston sensibilities will be shocked by her father's half-Polynesian (Hapa) children, Donovan, Gilhooley and the Marquis de Lage concoct a scheme. Donovan will pretend to be the father of Doc's three children (Leilani, Sarah, and Luke), until Doc returns and can deal with the situation. Lelani, the eldest, reluctantly accepts the plan.

Amelia learns that during the war her father, Donovan, and Gilhooley were marooned on the Japanese-occupied island after their destroyer was sunk. With the help of the locals, they conducted guerrilla warfare against the Japanese. Besides a hospital, her father built a large house, where a portrait of a beautiful Polynesian woman in royal attire is displayed prominently. The woman is Doc's late wife, the mother of his children, though Amelia is not told this. She learns that the woman was Manulani, who died in childbirth.

Life in the islands is not as expected. Amelia and Donovan initially clash over each being offended by the other's preconceptions. Amelia is not as prim and narrow-minded as Donovan expects. Donovan, who proves to be educated and intelligent, owns a substantial local shipping operation. When Donovan takes her boating, Amelia demonstrates skill in water skiing and beats Donovan in a swimming race to shore. Amelia takes warmly to “Donovan’s” children, unwittingly inviting them to a cozy Christmas at their own home. Donovan and Amelia gradually overcome their initial animosity. Meanwhile, Lage tries to court Amelia (or rather, her $18,000,000) and encourages her prejudice toward Donovan, telling her that Donovan has always been a bachelor despite “his” three children.

When Dr. Dedham returns, Donovan reveals the deception to him. Father and daughter meet, and Doc explains to Amelia that he was serving in the war when his wife (Amelia's mother) died. When the war ended, he was unneeded in Boston, but was desperately needed in the islands, so he stayed. He signs over his stock to Amelia. Just as he is about to explain about Manulani and their children, a hospital emergency interrupts.

Manulani was the granddaughter of the last hereditary prince of the islands, and Amelia finally solves the mystery: Leilani — Manulani's daughter — is not only the island's princess, but Amelia's half-sister, which they both joyfully acknowledge.

When Amelia confronts Donovan about his deception, she is insulted by his explanation that the deception was needed until she shook off her Boston rigidity. They quarrel and she plans to leave for Boston. At the Doc's urging, Amelia goes to see Donovan to take leave. Amelia and Donovan's farewells devolve into an argument and then morph into marriage plans. They decide to name their first son William, after her father. Gilhooley also finally marries his longtime girlfriend, Miss Lafleur. Donovan gives the bar to his old shipmate as a wedding present. Donovan moves his possessions into the big house as one of the family.

== Cast ==
- John Wayne as Michael Patrick "Guns" Donovan
- Lee Marvin as Thomas Aloysius 'Boats' Gilhooley
- Dorothy Lamour as Miss Lafleur
- Jack Warden as Dr. William Dedham
- Cesar Romero as Marquis Andre de Lage
- Dick Foran as Australian Navy Chief Petty Officer Sean O'Brien
- Elizabeth Allen as Amelia Dedham
- Marcel Dalio as Father Cluzeot
- Mike Mazurki as Sgt. Monk Menkowicz
- Jacqueline Malouf as Lelani Dedham
- Cherylene Lee as Sarah 'Sally' Dedham
- Jeffrey Byron as Luke Dedham (as Tim Stafford)
- Edgar Buchanan as Boston Attorney Francis X. O'Brian
- Patrick Wayne as Australian Navy Lt. (uncredited)
- Jon Fong as Mister Eu

== Production ==
The film was based on original material for Paramount prepared by James Michener (although Michener is not credited in the final film). In February 1962 Paramount announced that John Wayne and John Ford would make the film, then called South Sea Story, from a script by James Edward Grant. Martin Rackin helped put together the deal at Paramount.

Ford called it "a spoof picture – a whammy, crazy sort of thing. We're not going for any prizes."

While Donovan's Reef is set on the fictional island of Haleakaloha, which has a French governor, the only Polynesian language exhibited in the film is Hawaiian; "Haleakaloha" can be translated as "Home of Laughter and Love" (hale = home, aka = laugh, aloha = love). In fact, in the southern Polynesian dialect spoken in French Polynesia, the words are spelled with a T, where Hawaiian uses a K. The music is also Hawaiian, with its characteristic Hawaiian guitar.

Filming started in July 1962 on Kauai, Hawaii.

The home of the French island governor, the white beach house with coconut palms and surrounding grass lawn, is the Allerton Estate home and former summer residence of Hawaiian Queen Emma near Poipu Beach, now a part of the National Tropical Botanical Garden (without the scenes of boats and canoes on the Wailua River, which were edited and merged with scenes filmed at the Allerton Estate).

The unit then returned to Hollywood to finish scenes at Paramount studios.

The song "Pearly Shells" was used as the movie's opening theme and again in later scenes.

== Release ==
=== Box-office performance ===
Donovan's Reef was a moderate financial success. Produced on a budget of $2,686,000, the film grossed $6,600,000 in North America, earning $3.3 million in US theatrical rentals. It was the 24th-highest-grossing film of 1963.

=== Critical reception ===
A. H. Weiler of The New York Times wrote that the movie was "sheer contrivance effected in hearty, fun-loving, truly infectious style". Variety called it an "effort-less effort", but praised the photography. Currently, the film holds a 67% rating on the review aggregate website Rotten Tomatoes.

== See also ==
- List of American films of 1963
- John Wayne filmography
