= Milton Rosenstock =

American conductor, composer and arranger

Milton Rosenstock (June 9, 1917, New Haven, Connecticut - April 24, 1992, New York City) was an American conductor, composer, and arranger.

== Career ==
Trained at the Juilliard School, he was highly active as a musical director for Broadway musicals from 1942 through 1980; serving in that capacity for 29 productions, including the original productions of Gentlemen Prefer Blondes (1949), Can-Can (1953), Bells Are Ringing (1956), Stop the World – I Want to Get Off (1962), Oliver! (1963), Funny Girl (1964), and A Funny Thing Happened on the Way to the Forum (1972). He also composed the music for the 1973 revue Nash at Nine and worked as musical supervisor for the 1989 production of Meet Me in St. Louis; the latter of which was his last project on Broadway.

He served as the music director of the Lyric Chamber Theater during the 1960s and was the music director of the American Ballet Theatre during the late 1960s. From 1981 until his death eleven years later of heart disease he was principal conductor of the Dance Theatre of Harlem.

== Awards ==
In 1948 he won the Tony Award for Best Conductor and Musical Director for Finian's Rainbow. He was nominated twice more for that award: for The Vamp (1956) and the original Broadway production of Gypsy (1960).

== Broadway credits ==
- This Is The Army (1942, musical director)
- Finian's Rainbow (1947, musical director)
- Barefoot Boy With Cheek (1947, musical director)
- High Button Shoes (1947, musical director)
- Gentlemen Prefer Blondes (1949, musical director)
- Make a Wish (1951, musical director)
- Two's Company (1952, musical director)
- Can-Can (1953, musical director)
- The Vamp (1955, musical director)
- Bells Are Ringing (1956, musical director)
- Gypsy (1959, musical director)
- Show Girl (1961, musical director)
- Subways Are for Sleeping (1961, musical director)
- Stop the World – I Want to Get Off (1962, musical director)
- Oliver! (1963, musical director)
- Hot Spot (1963, musical director)
- Funny Girl (1964, musical director)
- Come Summer (1969, musical director)
- Jimmy (1969, musical director)
- Look to the Lilies (1970, musical director)
- On the Town (1971, musical director)
- A Funny Thing Happened on the Way to the Forum (1972, musical director)
- Nash at Nine (1972, composer, original score)
- Lorelei (1974, musical director)
- Gypsy (1974, musical director)
- Fiddler on the Roof (1976, musical director)
- The King and I (1977, musical director)
- The Music Man (1980, musical director)
- Meet Me in St. Louis (1989, Musical Supervisor)
