= The Vamp =

1955 Broadway musical

- Music: James Mundy
- Lyrics: John La Touche
- Book: Sam Locke; John La Touche
- Productions: 1955 Broadway

The Vamp is a stage musical with a book by Sam Locke and John La Touche with lyrics by La Touche and music by James Mundy.

The show is set in the 1920s and tells the story of Flora Weems, a farm girl turned actress and the behind the scenes drama of making a silent film version of Samson and Delilah.

== Production history ==
The show had its out-of-town tryout at the Shubert Theatre in New Haven, Connecticut, running from October 11–15, 1955. The show at the time was called Delilah and later renamed to The Vamp. The show next opened on Broadway at the Winter Garden Theatre on November 10, 1955 and closed on December 31, 1955 running for a total of 60 performances. The show was directed by David Alexander and choreographed by Robert Alton. Costumes and set design were by Raoul Pène Du Bois and musical direction was by Milton Rosenstock. The show was nominated for three Tony Awards including Best Lead Actress in a Musical for Carol Channing, Best Choreography and Best Conductor and Musical Director for Rosenstock.

== Original cast and characters ==
Character	Broadway (1955)
Flora Weems / Delilah	Carol Channing
Oliver Oxheart	David Atkinson
Bessie Bisco	Bibi Osterwald
Dick Hicks / Stanley Hubermyer	Robert Rippy
Elsie Chelsea	Patricia Hammerlee
Charlie	Matt Mattox
Myron Hubbard	Jack Waldron
Barney Ostertag	Paul Lipson
Stark Clayton	Malcolm Lee Beggs
Uncle Garvey	Will Geer
Samson / Muscle Man	Steve Reeves
Aunt Hester	Sandyl Cordell
Whip Man	David Kashner
Bluestone	Jack Harrold
Ensemble	Cathryn Damon

== Musical numbers ==
Act I

- "The Spiel" - Bessie, Myron, Company
- "The Flickers" - Company
- "Keep Your Nose to the Grindstone" - Flora, Uncle Garvey, Aunt Hester
- "That's Where a Man Fits In" - Flora
- "I've Always Loved You" - Flora, Company
- "You're Colossal" - Dick, Elsie
- "Fan Club Chant" - Company
- "Have You Met Delilah?" - Oliver
- "Yeemy Yeemy" - Flora, Company
- "The Vamps* - Company
- "Delilah's Dilemma" - Flora

Act II

- "Four Little Misfits" - Bessie, Elsie, Dick, Charlie
- "Samson and Delilah" - Company
- "Why Does It Have To Be You?" - Oliver
- "Ragtime Romeo" - Bessie, Charlie, Company
- "I'm Everybody's Baby" - Flora
- "I'm Everbody's Baby (reprise)" - Company
- "The Impossible She" - Oliver, Company
- "Finale" - Company
