= Hansel and Gretel: An Opera Fantasy =

1954 film

Hansel and Gretel
- Theatrical release poster
- Directed by: John Paul
- Written by: Padraic Colum
- Produced by: Michael Myerberg
- Starring: Anna Russell; Mildred Dunnock; Frank Rogier; Delbert Anderson; Helen Boatwright; The Apollo Boys' Choir; Constance Brigham
- Cinematography: Martin Munkacsi
- Edited by: James F. Barclay
- Music by: Franz Allers
- Distributed by: RKO Radio Pictures
- Release date: October 10, 1954
- Running time: 72 minutes
- Country: United States
- Language: English
- Budget: $1.1 million

Hansel and Gretel is a 1954 stop-motion animated theatrical feature film released by RKO Radio Pictures.

== Plot ==
Hansel and Gretel are hungry at home, they daydream and sing about food when their mother returns to find them not doing their work. She orders them to pick strawberries in the woods and they set off. Their father returns with food he bought with money from selling brooms, and mother tells him that she sent Hansel and Gretel into the woods. Now concerned, they set off to look for them but are misled by Rosina Rubylips, the witch. Hansel and Gretel pick strawberries but then proceed to eat them all. With night approaching, they become scared and head home. They suddenly see a mysterious man who reveals he is the Sandman and sings to them. They fall asleep and dream about angels. Upon waking up, a candy house appears in front of them. The witch locks Hansel in a cage and forces Gretel to help her fatten him up for eating. When checking that the gingerbread is cooking in the oven, they trick the witch and push her in. The house then disappears and it is revealed that the gingerbread figures in the yard are actually children. Hansel and Gretel wake them up and in their place is a gingerbread figure of the witch. Father and mother find them, and they all go home singing.

== Cast ==
- Anna Russell as Rosina Rubylips, the Witch
- Mildred Dunnock as Mother
- Frank Rogier as Father
- Constance Brigham as Hansel and Gretel
- Helen Boatwright as Dew Fairy
- Delbert Anderson as Sandman
- Apollo Boys’ Choir as Angels and Children

== Production ==
The film is based on Engelbert Humperdinck's opera Hänsel und Gretel, from which its music derives. It was the first American feature-length animated film not made by Disney since 1941's Mr. Bug Goes to Town and the first American feature-length animated film not made with traditional animation, and first RKO distributed animated film not produced by Disney.

In 1952, Evalds Dajevskis began working for Myerberg Productions to conceptualize the look of the film and design the miniature sets. Dajevskis built the sets out of thick papier-mâché, appliqued paper cutouts and painted backings. The witch's gingerbread house, the Hall of the Angels, and Hansel and Gretel's home were all constructed with trap doors underneath. Because the sets were so large, there was no way to reach and animate the figures except from below.

The film was shot in Myerberg's studio in New York. The puppets used in the film were called "kinemins." The bodies of the kinemins were sculpted in clay by James Summers and cast in foam latex by George Butler. Summers also painted the figures. The puppets were built to one-third scale and cost $2,500 each to build.

The witch character was renamed Rosina Rubylips. This differs from the original opera in which the witch tells Hansel that her name is Rosine Leckermaul (translated as Rosina Tastymuzzle).

The mother and father figures were sculpted to resemble Mildred Dunnock (Death of a Salesman) and Frank Rogier, who supplied their voices.

After production, the Hansel and Gretel sets were disassembled and eventually sold to an amusement park, Enchanted Forest in Old Forge, NY, where they were poorly reconstructed in a tent for display. In 1955, vandals looted Myerberg's studio and destroyed the remaining kinemins.

In 1965, screenwriter Padraic Colum sold his copy of the screenplay (along with his notebooks, manuscripts, galley proofs and letters) to the Binghamton University Libraries, where it is available for research viewing.

In 1971, producer Myerberg donated his personal papers to the library of the University of Wisconsin–Madison. Hansel and Gretel is among the productions documented through correspondence, contracts, financial records, promotional materials, reviews and scripts.

== Release ==
The film was released on October 10, 1954 in New York City without a distributor; producer Michael Myerberg released the film himself. Based on the positive reviews and box office performance, RKO Radio Pictures, which had previously released the output of Walt Disney, acquired the film for wide release for the Christmas season. The film was sold to television four years after it was released, where it became a Christmas-season tradition on several stations.

The film was rereleased theatrically in 1965 through New Trends Associates, and in March 1973 through Metro-Goldwyn-Mayer.

The film has been released on VHS, CED videodisc and DVD. The VHS and CED videodiscs contain the original title. The DVD was released on October 30, 2001 with the modified title of Hansel and Gretel: An Opera Fantasy.

An LP of the film's soundtrack was released in 1955 under the label "X" RCA, in 1959 under the label RCA Victor and in 1960 under the label RCA Camden. In 1959, it was nominated for a Grammy award in the category of Best Recording for Children.

== Awards and nominations ==
- 1954 Parents' Magazine Medal for Movie of the Month (October)
- 1959 Grammy Award nominee for Best Recording for Children (conductor Franz Aller)
- 1995 Dove Foundation Family Approved Seal

== Merchandise ==
RKO heavily promoted the film in time for the 1954 Christmas season, including $10 million worth of products such as candy, clothing, figurines and toys.

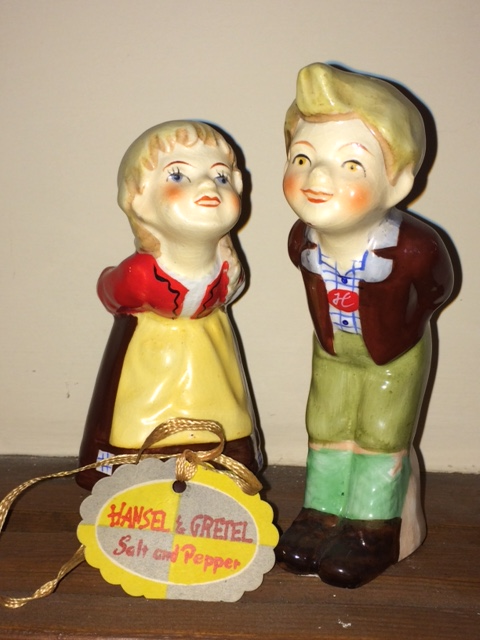
Salt and pepper shakers

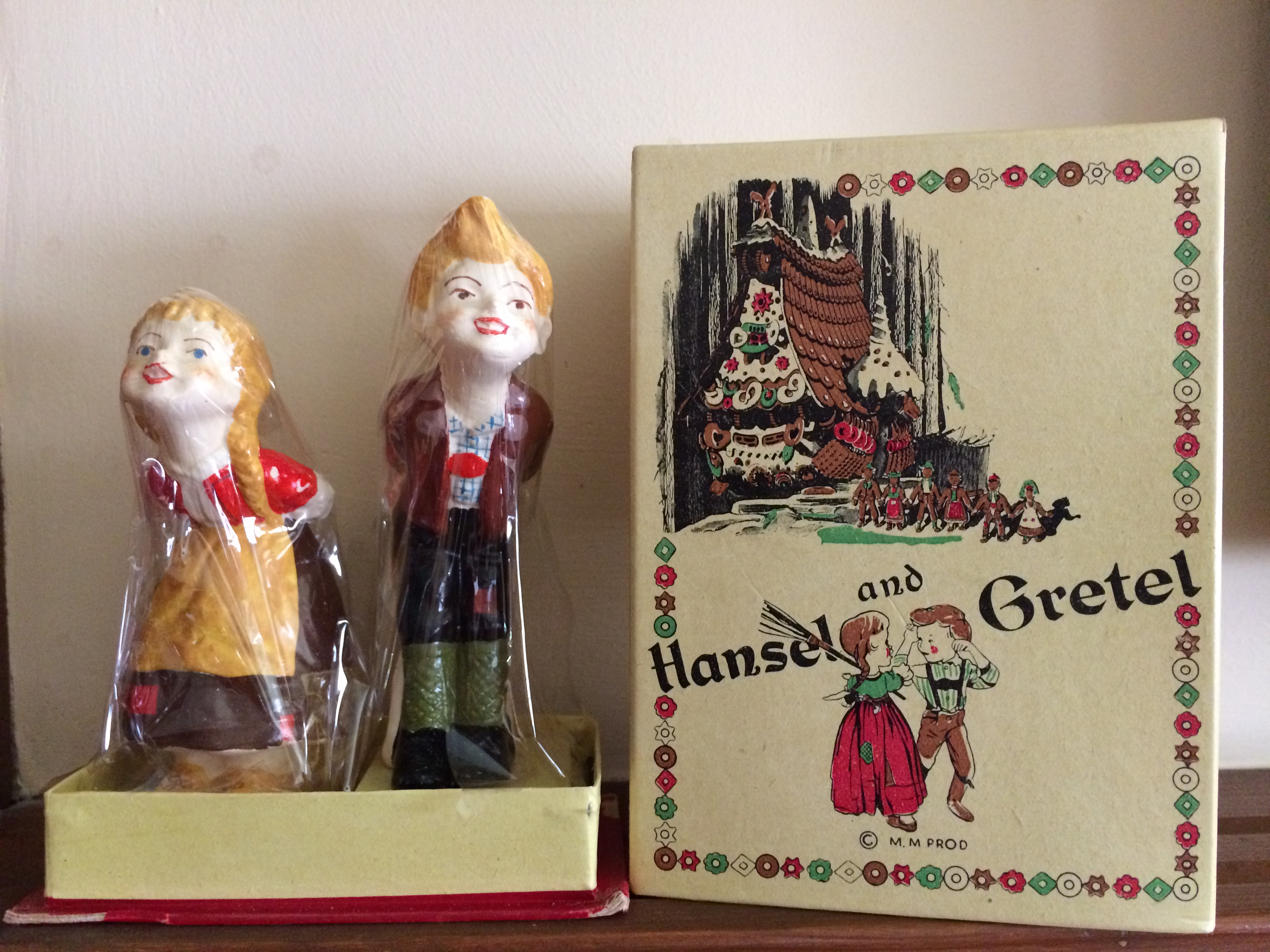
Soap set

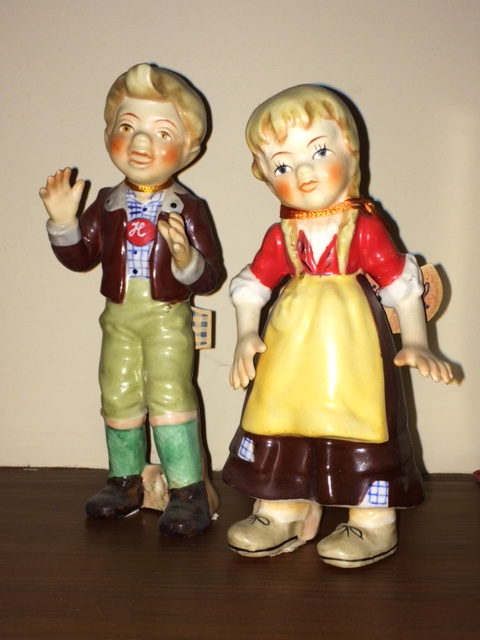
Figurines

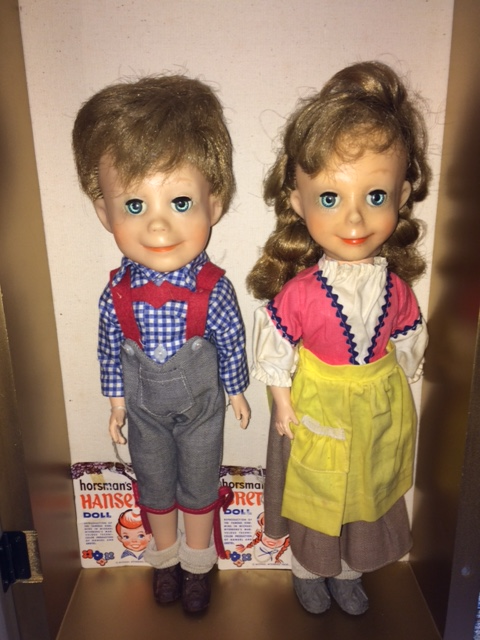
15" tall vinyl dolls by Horsman

A comic book adaptation was published by Dell Comics as issue #590 of its Four Color anthology series.

== See also ==
- List of films about witchcraft
