= Peter Matz =

American musician, composer, arranger and conductor (1928–2002)

Background information
- Born: November 6, 1928; Pittsburgh, Pennsylvania, U.S.
- Died: August 9, 2002 (aged 73) Los Angeles, California, U.S.
- Genres: Popular music
- Occupations: Musician, composer, arranger, conductor
- Instrument: Piano
- Years active: 1954–1995

Peter Matz (November 6, 1928 – August 9, 2002) was an American musician, composer, arranger, and conductor. His musical career in film, theater, television, and studio recording spanned fifty years. He worked with a number of prominent artists, including Marlene Dietrich, Noël Coward and Barbra Streisand. Matz won three Emmys and a Grammy Award. He is best known for his work on Streisand's early albums and for his tour as the orchestral conductor and musical director for The Carol Burnett Show.

== Biography ==
Peter Matz was born in Pittsburgh, Pennsylvania, on November 6, 1928, to Louis N. Matz and Alice (née Krieger) Matz. He studied Chemical Engineering at the University of California, Los Angeles, but after playing woodwinds in local dance bands to support himself, he soon realised that music was his real vocation.

After graduating Matz spent two years in Paris studying piano and music theory. In 1954, he returned to New York and acquired a job as a rehearsal pianist for Harold Arlen and Truman Capote's Broadway musical House of Flowers. Recognizing Matz's talent, Arlen broadened his scope, and Matz arranged and conducted the music for several of the show's dance sequences. Later, Arlen commissioned Matz to write the vocal, dance music and orchestration arrangements for his musical, Jamaica. Impressed with Matz, Arlen began recommending him to others, including cabaret artist Marlene Dietrich.

In 1955, Dietrich recommended Matz to Noël Coward when the English playwright, actor and singer was scheduled to perform in Las Vegas, but without his accompanist Norman Hackforth who had been denied a US work permit. Coward was impressed with Matz and described him as "quick, intelligent and a fine pianist". Matz went on to work with Coward on his albums, television specials and his musical Sail Away. In 1962, Matz was Musical Director for Richard Rodgers's Broadway musical No Strings, for which he received a Tony nomination.

In 1958, Matz married (Dolores) Janet Perry, with whom he had two children: Peter Zachary Matz and Jonas Christopher Matz; they were married 20 years. In 1981, Matz married Marilyn Lovell Matz, an actress and eventual AIDS activist. The couple remained together until Matz's death in 2002.

In the early 1960s, Matz began working with Barbra Streisand on her first album, which won several Grammy Awards and brought her stardom. He continued arranging and conducting on her next four albums and won a Grammy Award himself for her 1964 album, People. Later, Matz won an Emmy Award for her 1965 television special My Name Is Barbra, and an Oscar nomination for Best Original Score for her 1975 film Funny Lady. He won two more Emmys, for an episode of the TV series, Kraft Music Hall, and for an episode of The Carol Burnett Show. Matz was musical director for The Carol Burnett Show for eight seasons. Matz was the orchestra leader on Hullabaloo from January 1965 to August 1966. He served as both conductor and arranger for the Burt Bacharach and Hal David musical On the Flip Side (1966) which starred Ricky Nelson and Joanie Sommers.

Over the years, Matz worked with a number of prominent artists, including Tony Bennett, Bing Crosby, Lena Horne, Peggy Lee, k.d. lang, Bette Midler, Rosemary Clooney, Liza Minnelli, Elaine Paige, Chicago, Dolly Parton, Dame Kiri Te Kanawa, Sarah Vaughan and Dionne Warwick. He also composed music for a number of films and television series. Toward the end of his career, Matz and his wife, singer Marilyn Lovell, gave a series of benefit concerts in Los Angeles for people with HIV/AIDS, for which he received a Special Los Angeles City Council Award. In mid-2002 he finished his last work, the arrangements for the Symphony Pop Production My Paris for singer Tony Sandler.

Matz died of lung cancer on August 9, 2002. A memorial concert in his honor was held at the University of California, Los Angeles, on November 25, 2002 and featured, among others, Carol Burnett and Burt Bacharach.

== Selected credits ==
Source: Film Reference

Television series

- Hullabaloo (1965–66) – music director
- Kraft Music Hall (1967–71) – music director
- The Carol Burnett Show (1971–78) – music director
- Detective School (1979) – music composer and director
- Amanda's (1983) – theme music composer
- Mama's Family (1983) – theme music composer

Television specials

- My Name Is Barbra (1965) – music director
- Color Me Barbra (1966) – music director
- On The Flip Side (1966) - conductor and arranger
- Once Upon a Mattress (1972) – music director
- Eunice (1982) – music composer
- The Carol Burnett Show: A Reunion (1993) – conductor and arranger
- Carol Burnett: The Special Years (1994) – conductor

Films

- Bye Bye Braverman (1968) – music composer and director
- Marlowe (1969) – music composer and director
- Rivals (1972) – music composer
- Funny Lady (1975) – music adapter, arranger and conductor
- Alice in Wonderland (1976) – music director
- The Call of the Wild (1976) – music composer
- The Great Houdini (1976) – music composer
- The Last Hurrah (1977) – music composer
- The Man in the Santa Claus Suit (1979) – music composer
- White Mama (1980) – music composer
- The Private Eyes (1980) – music composer and director
- Lust in the Dust (1985) – music composer and director
- Torch Song Trilogy (1988) – music adapter
- Stepping Out (1991) – music composer

Theater

- Sail Away (1961–62) – musical director and dance arranger
- No Strings (1962) – musical director, conductor, and dance arranger
- The Boys from Syracuse (1963) – ballet music composer
- Hallelujah, Baby! (1967) – orchestrator
- Girl Crazy (1985) – orchestrator
- Grand Hotel (1989) – orchestrator
- Here Comes J. Edgar! (2026) – composer

Albums

- Noel Coward at Las Vegas (1955–56) – arranger and conductor (recorded live in 1955 at the Desert Inn, Las Vegas, and in 1956 at a New York recording studio)
- Noel Coward in New York (1956) – arranger and conductor
- No Strings (1962) - arranger and conductor (Broadway musical, music composed by Richard Rodgers)
- The Barbra Streisand Album (1963) – arranger and conductor
- The Second Barbra Streisand Album (1963) – arranger and conductor
- People (1964) – arranger and conductor
- Liza! Liza! (1964) – arranger and conductor
- Second to None (Carmen McRae) (1964) – arranger and conductor
- Tom Jones the Musical (1964) - arranger and conductor
- Ruth Brown '65 (Mainstream, 1965) – arranger and conductor
- Color Me Barbra (1966) – arranger and conductor
- It Amazes Me (1965) – arranger and conductor
- Peter Matz Brings 'Em Back (1967) - arranger and conductor
- Tony Bennett: Tony Sings the Songs of Today! (1969) – arranger and conductor
- Quadraphonic Spectacular (1972) - arranger and conductor
- The Ethel Merman Disco Album (1979) – arranger, conductor, and producer
- The Broadway Album (1985) – arranger, conductor, and producer
- Samuel Ramey Sings Rodgers and Hammerstein (1989) – arranger and conductor
- Melissa Manchester:Tribute (1989) – arranger, conductor, and producer
- Listen to My Heart (1995) – arranger and conductor

== Awards ==
| Year | Award | Category | Work | Ref. |
|---|---|---|---|---|
| 1964 | Grammy Award | Best Accompaniment Arrangement for Vocalist(s) or Instrumentalist(s) | People (Barbra Streisand album) | |
| 1965 | Emmy Award | Outstanding Individual Achievements in Entertainment – Musicians | My Name Is Barbra (Barbra Streisand TV special) | |
| 1970 | Emmy Award | Outstanding Achievement in Music Direction of a Variety, Musical or Dramatic Program | Kraft Music Hall (TV series, episode "The Sound of Burt Bacharach") | |
| 1973 | Emmy Award | Outstanding Achievement in Music Direction of a Variety, Musical or Dramatic Program | The Carol Burnett Show (TV series, episode with Anthony Newley and Bernadette Peters) | |
