= Elizabeth Allen (actress) =

American actress (1929–2006)

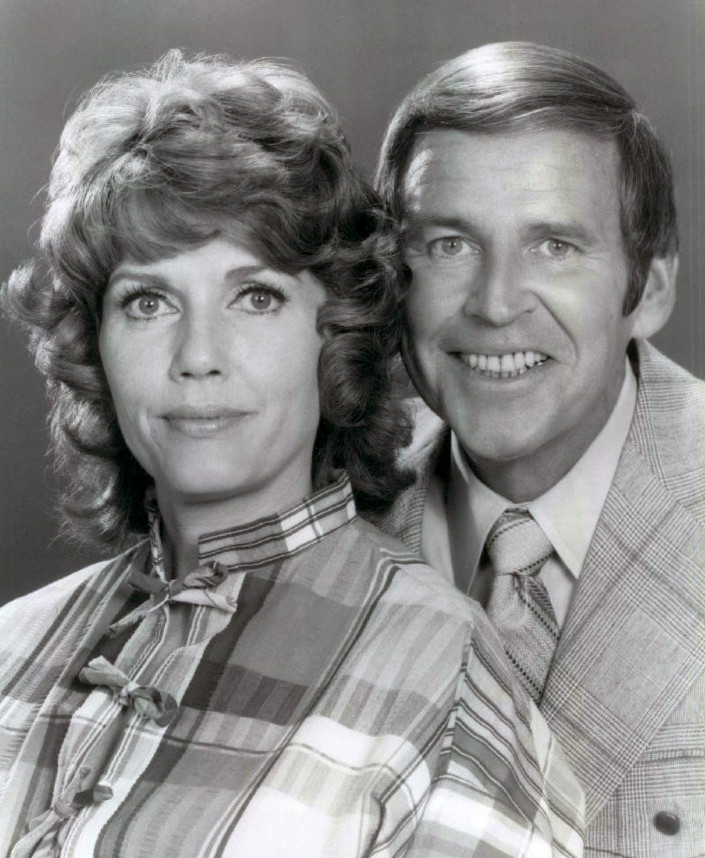
- Allen and Paul Lynde in publicity photo for The Paul Lynde Show (1972)
- Born: Elizabeth Ellen Gillease; January 25, 1929; Jersey City, New Jersey, U.S.
- Died: September 19, 2006 (aged 77); Fishkill, New York, U.S.
- Occupation: Actress
- Years active: 1955–1996
- Known for: Donovan's Reef; Cheyenne Autumn; Texas
- Spouse: Baron Karl von Vietinghoff-Scheel (m. 1952; div. 1955)

Elizabeth Allen (born Elizabeth Ellen Gillease, January 25, 1929 — September 19, 2006) was an American theatre, television, and film actress and singer whose 40-year career lasted from the mid-1950s through the mid-1990s, and included scores of TV episodes and six theatrical features, two of which (1963's Donovan's Reef, for which she received a second-place Golden Laurel Award as Top New Female Personality, and 1964's Cheyenne Autumn) were directed by John Ford.

She was a cast member in five TV series: The Jackie Gleason Show (1956–1957), Bracken's World (1969–1970), The Paul Lynde Show (1972–1973), C.P.O. Sharkey (1976–1977), and the daytime drama Texas (1980–1981), while also maintaining a thriving theatrical career as a musical comedy star and receiving two Tony nominations, in 1962 for The Gay Life and in 1965 for Do I Hear a Waltz?.

== Early life ==
Born in Jersey City, New Jersey, Allen began her career as a Ford Agency high-fashion model.

== Television ==
Allen landed the television role of the "Away We Go!" girl on The Jackie Gleason Show in the 1950s. She made numerous television appearances in guest-starring roles on such programs as The Fugitive, Kojak, and Buck Rogers in the 25th Century. She was also a regular cast member on TV's Bracken's World, The Paul Lynde Show, C.P.O. Sharkey, Another World, and its spin-off, Texas. Her television, film, and stage career spanned three decades.

She was featured with William Shatner in "The Hungry Glass", the 16th episode in the first season of Boris Karloff's Thriller in 1961. In 1962, she played a leading role in the first season of Combat!, in the episode "No Hallelujahs for Glory" as a persistent war correspondent.

Allen is perhaps best known on TV for her role as the creepy saleslady in the first-season episode of Rod Serling's original version of The Twilight Zone, entitled "The After Hours", where actress Anne Francis (playing Miss Marsha White) finally realizes that she is a mannequin and that her month of freedom and living among the humans is over. Allen's saleslady character (seen by no one but Marsha) is the mannequin whose turn in the outside world is up next and has already been delayed by one full day, thus explaining her slightly peeved attitude.

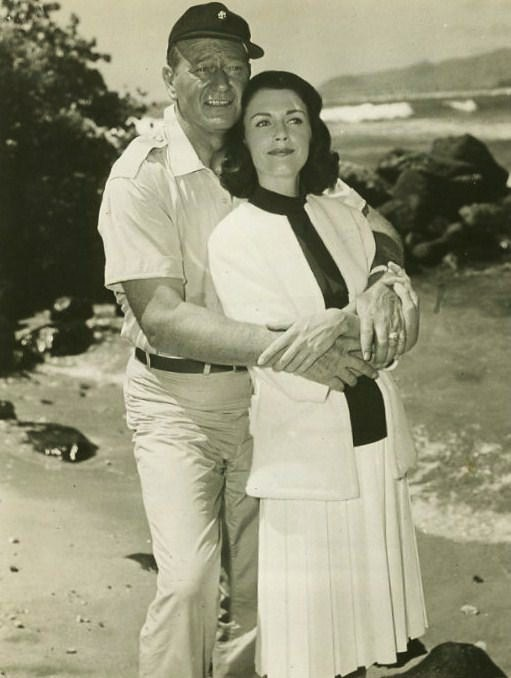
With John Wayne in Donovan's Reef (1963)

== Film ==
In 1963, Allen starred with John Wayne, Dorothy Lamour, and Lee Marvin in the John Ford film Donovan's Reef. She also starred in Diamond Head with Charlton Heston and Yvette Mimieux. Both movies were filmed on location in Hawaii. Allen also appeared with James Stewart in Cheyenne Autumn and won a Laurel Award in 1963 as the year's most promising film actor.

== Stage ==
Allen honed her stage skills by joining and performing with the Helen Hayes Repertory Group before expanding into the big and small screens. Allen was twice nominated for Tony Awards for her performances on Broadway in The Gay Life, as Actress, Supporting or Featured (Musical) (1962) and Do I Hear a Waltz?, as Best Actress in a Musical (1965). She can be heard singing throughout the original cast album of Waltz, available on CD.

Her other notable stage productions on the Great White Way and beyond included Romanoff and Juliet, Lend an Ear, Sherry!, California Suite, The Pajama Game, The Tender Trap, Show Boat, and South Pacific, and culminating in the 1980s Broadway musical 42nd Street, as fading star Dorothy Brock. In 1983, she appeared as Dr. Gwen Harding on the CBS soap opera Guiding Light.

Allen quietly retired from show business in 1996, after touring numerous cities throughout the world for over a decade with her 42nd Street role from Broadway. This was her last, significant acting job after appearing in Texas for two seasons.

== Other activities ==
In the late 1970s, Allen ventured into retail business, as she operated a dress store in a San Fernando Valley shopping mall. Entertainment columnist Dick Kleiner reported: "She found a vacant store, rented it, decorated it. She does all her own buying and delivering ... and a lot of the selling." She told Kleiner that she thought it wise "for an actor to have something going for her when there is nothing doing on the acting front."

== Personal life and death ==
She was married briefly to Baron Karl von Vietinghoff-Scheel, but they divorced and she never remarried. Allen later appeared on the game show Tattletales in the 1970s as the partner of Charles Nelson Reilly, though Reilly was gay in real life. This was done so that Reilly could appear on the show.

Allen died from kidney disease, aged 77, in Fishkill, New York. She was predeceased by her only sibling, brother Joseph L. Gillease, and survived by her sister-in-law, Marion Gillease, her nephew and godson, Patrick J. Gillease, her niece, Erin Gillease Phelan, and two grand-nieces, Alicia Phelan and Alexandria Phelan.

== Broadway credits ==
- 1957 Romanoff and Juliet as Juliet
- 1962 The Gay Life as Magda
- 1965 Do I Hear a Waltz? as Leona Samish
- 1967 Sherry! as Maggie Cutler
- 1983 42nd Street as Dorothy Brock (replacing Tammy Grimes)

== Filmography ==
- 1960: "The After Hours" on The Twilight Zone (TV Series) as Saleswoman
- 1960: From the Terrace as Sage Remmington
- 1962: Diamond Head as Laura Beckett
- 1963: The Alfred Hitchcock Hour (Season 1 Episode 15: "The Thirty-First of February") as Molly O'Rourke
- 1963: Donovan's Reef as Ameilia Sarah Dedham
- 1963: Stoney Burke (TV Series) as Kelly
- 1963-1966 The Fugitive (TV Series) as Sharon Brame / Louanne Crowell / Ruth Harmon
- 1964: Cheyenne Autumn as Guinevere Plantagenet
- 1971: Star Spangled Girl as Mrs. MacKaninee, the landlady
- 1972: The Carey Treatment as Evelyn Randall
- 1979: No Other Love (TV Movie) as Jean Michaels
