= Ross (play) =

1960 play by Terence Rattigan

- 1st edition (publ. Hamish Hamilton), Alec Guinness as Ross
- Original language: English
- Written by: Terence Rattigan
- Characters: T. E. Lawrence
- Genre: Drama
- Setting: Dorset & Arabia

Premiere
- Date: 1960
- Place: Theatre Royal, Haymarket, London

Ross is a 1960 play by British playwright Terence Rattigan.

It is a biographical play about T. E. Lawrence and his time in the Royal Air Force.

== Plot synopsis ==
The play is structured with a framing device set in 1922, when Lawrence was hiding under an assumed name as "Aircraftman Ross" in the Royal Air Force, and is being disciplined by his Flight Lieutenant for alleged misconduct. No one seems to have become aware of his true identity, except for a man named Dickinson, who had seen Lawrence at the Paris Peace Conference of 1919 and quickly attempts to blackmail him to keep his identity secret. Lawrence, however, refuses, and Dickinson decides to reveal his identity to the Daily Mirror.

After Lawrence has a dream sequence, flashing back to the various figures in his life, the play flashes back to mid-1916. Lawrence is being given an unofficial assignment as a liaison officer to the forces of the Arab Revolt, under Prince Feisal (who, although he is frequently mentioned, never appears as a character). Sir Ronald Storrs, the head of the Arab Bureau, tries to talk him out of the mission, as does Colonel Barrington, a bull-headed intelligence officer. Along with two Arab servants, Hamed and Rashid (similar to Lawrence's real-life companions Farraj and Daud), Lawrence enters the desert, revealing that he feels that the supreme being of the world is "the will", and he believes that he can achieve anything if he puts his mind to it.

Lawrence later meets Auda ibu Tayi, leader of the Howeitat tribe of Bedouin, using flattery to convert him to the Arab cause (he has been paid off by the Turks to support them). Auda and Lawrence soon plan an expedition through the Nefud Desert to capture the Turkish-held port of Aqaba, which is weakly defended from the landward side. Along the way to Aqaba, however, he is forced to execute an Arab for murdering another in a feud.

Meanwhile, the Turkish military governor of Deraa and his subordinate, a captain, watch with growing unease Lawrence's campaign against the Hejaz Railway, though they fail to ascertain the target of his campaign. The General decides to place a reward of £20,000 on Lawrence for his capture, and these leads to a comic scene where the Captain arrives in Auda's camp to offer him the reward, and Lawrence is present. Unable to act despite recognising Lawrence, the Captain is forced to leave the camp. At the end of Act I, Lawrence arrives at an army outpost in the Sinai Peninsula and uses a telephone station (despite the protests of a British naval officer) to report the Arab capture of Aqaba.

Act II begins in the office of the new commander of the Egyptian Expeditionary Force, General Edmund Allenby, who is present with Storrs and Barrington. Allenby asks their opinions of Lawrence before Lawrence himself arrives. Storrs praises Lawrence, while Barrington finds him repugnant and undeserving of a position of responsibility. Allenby engages Lawrence in a brief discussion, which includes chat about archaeology, literature, and furniture, alternating with a serious discussion about the progress of the war. While Allenby wants Lawrence to be the permanent commander of the Arab liaison forces, Lawrence expresses the view that he is not up to the task, and admits to a conflict of conscience over aiding the Arabs while being aware of the Sykes-Picot Agreement to divide up the Ottoman Empire – although Allenby convinces him otherwise.

On a reconnaissance mission in Deraa, Lawrence speaks with Hamed, with whom he has grown close, as Rasheed, the other servant, died on the march to Aqaba. Hamed has tried to bribe more Arabs into joining the cause, but they have been frightened into refusing by the Turks. Lawrence is arrested by a Turkish army sergeant, believing him to be a Circassian army deserter. He is taken back to Turkish HQ, where on the orders of the General, he is beaten and then raped. This is a deliberate action by the General, who feels that Lawrence is too extraordinary an enemy to simply kill; he must destroy his will and his personality through such an act, thus revealing his weakness.

At the beginning of Act III, Allenby has just received word of the fall of Jerusalem and is posing for photographs for a journalist named Franks (a stand-in for Lowell Thomas), who requests an interview with Lawrence. During this scene Barrington (now a Brigadier General on Allenby's staff) asks Lawrence to deny that his men execute prisoners, although he is disgusted when Lawrence admits that they have. Allenby interrupts the conversation, and discusses Lawrence's request to be transferred from Arabia – a request Allenby turns down. Lawrence feels that he has learned "the truth" about himself, refusing to discuss his rape with Allenby. At this point, Storrs enters, informing Allenby that the British government wants him to enter Jerusalem in a triumph – and Allenby all but forces Lawrence to take part in the parade.

The last sequence occurs in September 1918, the last days of the war, after the Battle of Megiddo has smashed the Turkish armies and the road to Damascus is all but open. Speaking with an RAF officer, Flight Lieutenant Higgins, Lawrence recounts his own force's hand in the operation, including the massacre of 4,000 Turks outside Tafas, in retaliation for their sack of the village. However, Higgins is more disturbed about Lawrence's execution of a wounded colleague – later revealed to be Hamed, Lawrence's servant.

Lawrence then meets with Auda, recounting the death of Hamed. Lawrence inadvertently reveals the British treachery towards the Arabs to Auda, although he then promises Auda that he will fight for the Arabs "to the limits of my strength". At this point Barrington arrives, and Auda expresses his admiration for Lawrence to him before exiting.

After Auda's departure, Barrington complains that the Arab forces occupying Deraa have committed atrocities against Turkish soldiers captured there and refuses to allow the Arabs to garrison the city. He also discusses the Tafas massacre with Lawrence, referring to him as a "callous, soulless, sadistic little brute", while Lawrence concedes that he is "lost to all human feeling". The play ends in 1922, with the RAF officers trying to smuggle Lawrence away from the barracks before the press, newly alerted to the identity of "Ross", can descend on them.

== Notable productions ==
- The original 1960 production starred Alec Guinness as Lawrence, Harry Andrews as Allenby and Gerald Harper as Dickinson and opened at the Theatre Royal, Haymarket in London's West End on 12 May, where it was well reviewed, and ran for almost two years (making it Rattigan's second most commercially successful play, after While the Sun Shines). Michael Bryant replaced Guinness as Lawrence late in the show's run.
- A New York production in 1961 starred John Mills as Lawrence, John Williams as Dickinson and Geoffrey Keen, amongst others, in a supporting role.
- In 1970 the play was broadcast as a Play of the Month by BBC Television, featuring Ian McKellen, Edward Fox as Dickinson and Charles Gray.
- In 1986, the first West End revival was produced starring Simon Ward as Lawrence and Marc Sinden as Dickinson, with David Langton, Roland Curram, Bruce Montague and Ernest Clark in supporting roles. It toured the UK and after a run at the Royal Alexandra Theatre, Toronto opened at The Old Vic.
- Ross was originally written as a film script for the Rank Organization, with Dirk Bogarde cast as Lawrence. The project fell through due to a combination of financial difficulties and political turmoil in Iraq, where it was to be filmed. A later attempt to adapt the play, with Laurence Harvey as Lawrence, was scrapped when David Lean's Lawrence of Arabia went into production.
- Alec Guinness, who had played Lawrence to great acclaim in the theatre, played Prince Faisal, who never appears in the play but is mentioned frequently, in the 1962 film Lawrence of Arabia.
- A 1961 production in Paris of the French translation starred Pierre Fresnay in the title role.
- The play was revived at the Chichester Festival Theatre from 3 – 25 June 2016 to mark the centenary of the outbreak of the Arab Revolt, and starred Joseph Fiennes and Peter Polycarpou.
