= The Gay Life =

- Original Cast Recording
- Music: Arthur Schwartz
- Lyrics: Howard Dietz
- Book: Fay Kanin; Michael Kanin
- Basis: Seven plays by Arthur Schnitzler
- Productions: 1961 Broadway

The Gay Life is a musical with a book by Fay and Michael Kanin, lyrics by Howard Dietz, and music by Arthur Schwartz.

Based on a cycle of seven short plays by Arthur Schnitzler, published in 1893 and first staged in 1910, The Gay Life focuses on womanizing playboy Anatol von Huber. The score is a mixture of traditional Broadway show tunes and operetta.

== Production ==
The Gay Life started pre-Broadway try-outs at the Fisher Theater in Detroit and the O'Keefe Centre in Toronto. The production opened on Broadway at the Shubert Theatre on November 18, 1961, and closed on February 24, 1962, after 113 performances and three previews. Directed by Gerald Freedman and choreographed by Herbert Ross, the cast included Walter Chiari as Anatol, Barbara Cook as Liesl, and Jules Munshin as Max, with Elizabeth Allen as Magda and Leonard Elliott as Franz.

Owing to the new meaning which the term "gay" had acquired since the show's original staging, its title was changed to The High Life when it was presented in concert by the off-Broadway Musicals Tonight! in October 2005.

== Synopsis ==
In Vienna in 1904, Anatol von Huber is to marry Liesl, but his former mistress is discovered with him on his wedding day. In flashback Anatol remembers how he arrived at this circumstance.

Anatol, a confirmed bachelor and playboy, has decided the time has come to settle down and get married. His target is the sister of his best friend Max, the virginal Liesl, whose longtime crush on him makes her the likeliest candidate. But the young lady is determined to tame the philanderer and make him swear to be true to her before she accepts his proposal.

After meeting Anatol for the first time since she was a child at the marriage mart in Carlsbad, Liesl decides that Anatol is the man for her. However, as the guests waltz, Anatol leaves with the Frenchwoman Mimi.

When they meet again on Christmas Eve, Liesl tells Anatol how she feels, even though he is with Mimi.

Anatol learns that Mimi plans on leaving him, and he invents a story about his relationship with Liesl. Anatol does in fact propose, but Liesl is doubtful they will really marry. Her doubts seem to come true when his old flame, Magda, is found in his bedroom. Although Liesl declares that she will not marry him, he proposes again, and they marry.

== Original cast and characters ==
Character	Broadway (1961)
Anatol	Walter Chiari
Liesl Brandel	Barbara Cook
Max	Jules Munshin
Herr Brandel	Loring Smith
Magda	Elizabeth Allen
Helene	Jeanne Bal
Frau Brandel	Yvonne Constant
Franz	Leonard Elliott
Frau Brandel	Lu Leonard

== Songs ==
Act I

- What A Charming Couple - Ensemble
- Why Go Anywhere at All? - Helene
- Bring Your Darling Daughter - Max, Ensemble
- Now I'm Ready for a Frau - Anatol, Max
- Magic Moment - Liesl
- Who Can? You Can - Anatol, Liesl
- Oh, Mein Liebchen - Ensemble
- The Label on the Bottle - Liesl
- This Kind of a Girl - Anatol, Liesl
- The Bloom Is Off the Rose - Max, Male Ensemble
- Who Can? You Can (Reprise) - Ensemble
- Now I'm Ready for a Frau (Reprise) - Anatol
- Magic Moment (Reprise) - Liesl

Act II

- I'm Glad I'm Single - Max and Male Ensemble
- Now I'm Ready for a Frau (Reprise) - Anatol and Max
- Something You Never Had Before - Liesl
- You Will Never Be Lonely - Frau Brandel, Herr Brandel and Ensemble
- You're Not the Type - Anatol and Liesl
- Come A-Wandering With Me - Magda and Male Dancers
- I Never Had a Chance - Anatol
- I Wouldn't Marry You - Liesl
- For the First Time - Anatol

== Critical response ==
Howard Taubman, reviewing for The New York Times, called the show "colorful, cheerful, and leisurely in an Old World way" and wrote: "The nicest of all the gemutlich...is Barbara Cook. As Liesl she conveys an enchanting blend of gentle simplicity and independent character. The integrity of her acting and her singing voice gives an oft-told sentimental story the credibility of human warmth."

== Recording ==
An original cast recording was released by Capitol Records (Capitol WAO 1560 and SWAO 1560) and later released on CD by Angel, then DRG. John Wilson, reviewing the album in The New York Times wrote that "relieved of the encumbrance of the book the score is sunny and lilting with extremely hummable songs."

== Awards and nominations ==
=== Original Broadway production ===
Year	Award	Category	Nominee	Result
1962	Tony Award	Best Performance by a Featured Actress in a Musical	Elizabeth Allen	Nominated
1962	Tony Award	Best Conductor and Musical Director	Herbert Greene	Nominated
1962	Tony Award	Best Scenic Design	Oliver Smith	Nominated
1962	Tony Award	Best Costume Design	Lucinda Ballard	Won
