= Gideon (play) =

Play by Paddy Chayefsky

- Written by: Paddy Chayefsky
- Based on: Book of Judges
- Genre: comedy drama

Premiere
- Date: November 9, 1961
- Place: Plymouth Theatre
- Directed by: Tyrone Guthrie
- Original run: Nov 09, 1961 - Jun 02, 1962

Gideon, a play by Paddy Chayefsky, is a seriocomic treatment of the story of Gideon, a judge in the Old Testament. The play had a successful Broadway run in 1961 and was broadcast on NBC in 1971 as a Hallmark Hall of Fame special.

== The story ==
Chayefsky drew from three chapters in the Book of Judges in writing this play, which explores the relationship of an ordinary man to God.

"The Angel of the Lord" appears before Gideon and drafts him to perform one of God's miracles. Gideon is to save his people from idolatry by winning an impossible battle in which 300 Israelites will defeat 120,000 Midianites.

In the second act, which a Time magazine review described as the weaker of the play's two acts, Gideon asks to be released from his "covenant of love" with God. Gideon ignores God's order to kill some idolatrous Hebrew tribal chiefs, one of whom has a daughter who performs a seductive dance.

Gideon tells God, "You are too vast a concept for me." Gideon explains that his pity for fellow humans is above God's law. The Lord acknowledges that man wants to be "a proper god. You know, he might some day."

== The cast ==
In the original Broadway version, Gideon was played by Douglas Campbell and Fredric March played "The Angel of the Lord." In the television adaptation, Peter Ustinov played Gideon and José Ferrer played "The Angel of the Lord."

The Time reviewer described Campbell's portrayal of Gideon in the 1961 production as "a simple-minded oaf one minute and a Judaic Henry V the next." TV Guide noted that Ustinov played Gideon as "a lumbering Hebrew" in the NBC adaptation.

== Reception ==
Gideon was a critical success. A highly positive review appeared in the Chicago Tribune, where it was written that Chayefsky "has a knack for looking into the lives and personalities of common people and finding humor, pathos and even greatness." John J. O'Connor conversely stated, "Neither very deep nor especially sweeping, 'Gideon' is a modest achievement, but its very modesty can be charming."

== Television adaptation ==
The 90-minute Hallmark Hall of Fame adaptation on NBC aired in the United States on Friday, March 26, 1971 at 8:30 p.m. Eastern Time. It pre-empted Name of the Game.

Chayefsky's Broadway script was adapted for television by Robert Hartung. George Schaefer produced and directed the TV version.

=== Closed-circuit experiment ===
Four performances of the play were transmitted over telephone lines from the stage of the Plymouth Theatre to a screen in the Auditorium Theater in Rochester, New York, in March 1962 to test closed-circuit television. The audience in Rochester watched the live performances in black and white on a 20 x 15 foot screen.

=== Cast ===
- Gideon — Peter Ustinov
- Angel of the Lord — José Ferrer
- Joash — Arnold Moss
- Shillem — Eric Christmas
- Orpah — Little Egypt
- Hezekiah — Booth Colman
- Abimelech — Harry Davis

== Awards and nominations ==
=== Original Broadway production ===
Year	Award	Category	Nominee	Result
1962	Tony Award	Best Play		Nominated
1962	Tony Award	Best Actor in a Play	Fredric March	Nominated
1962	Tony Award	Best Direction of a Play	Tyrone Guthrie	Nominated
1962	Tony Award	Best Producer	Fred Coe and Arthur Cantor	Nominated
1962	New York Drama Critics' Circle Award	Best Play		Nominated
