= Max Meth =

Austrian-American Broadway musical director and conductor

Max Meth (25 February 1900 – 3 January 1984) was an Austrian-American Broadway musical director and conductor for over 40 years (1927–1968). He came to the United States from Austria. He won the Tony Award twice, in 1949 for the original As the Girls Go, and in 1952 for a revival of Pal Joey.

== Broadway credits ==
- Artists and Models Nov 15, 1927 – Mar 24, 1928
- The Greenwich Village Follies Apr 9, 1928 – July 28, 1928
- A Night in Venice May 21, 1929 – Oct 19, 1929
- Nina Rosa Sep 20, 1930 – Jan 17, 1931
- The New Yorkers Dec 8, 1930 – May 2, 1931
- Ballyhoo of 1932 Sep 6, 1932 – Nov 26, 1932
- Take a Chance Nov 26, 1932 – July 1, 1933
- Roberta Nov 18, 1933 – July 21, 1934
- Say When Nov 8, 1934 – Jan 12, 1935
- Revenge with Music Nov 28, 1934 – May 27, 1935
- Parade May 20, 1935 – June 22, 1935
- Right This Way Jan 5, 1938 – Jan 15, 1938
- Sing Out the News Sep 24, 1938 - Jan 7, 1939
- Leave It to Me! - Replacement Nov 9, 1938 – July 15, 1939
- Cabin in the Sky Oct 25, 1940 – Mar 8, 1941
- Let's Face It! Oct 29, 1941 – Mar 20, 1943
- Jackpot Jan 13, 1944 – Mar 11, 1944
- Dream With Music May 18, 1944 – June 10, 1944
- Up in Central Park Jan 27, 1945 – Apr 13, 1946
- Beggar's Holiday Dec 26, 1946 – Mar 29, 1947
- Finian's Rainbow – Replacement Jan 10, 1947 – Oct 2, 1948
- As the Girls Go Nov 13, 1948 – Jan 14, 1950
- Great to Be Alive! Mar 23, 1950 – May 6, 1950
- Pal Joey (Revival) Jan 3, 1952 – Apr 18, 1953
- Seventh Heaven May 26, 1955 – July 2, 1955
- Ziegfeld Follies of 1957 Mar 1, 1957 – Jun 15, 1957
- Finian's Rainbow (Revival) May 23, 1960 – June 1, 1960
- The Unsinkable Molly Brown - Replacement Nov 3, 1960 – Feb 10, 1962
- The Megilla of Itzik Manger Oct 9, 1968 – Dec 15, 1968

== Awards ==
- 1949 Tony Award for Best Conductor and Musical Director – As the Girls Go (winner)
- 1952 Tony Award for Best Conductor and Musical Director – Pal Joey (winner)
