= Betty Jane Watson =

American actress and singer

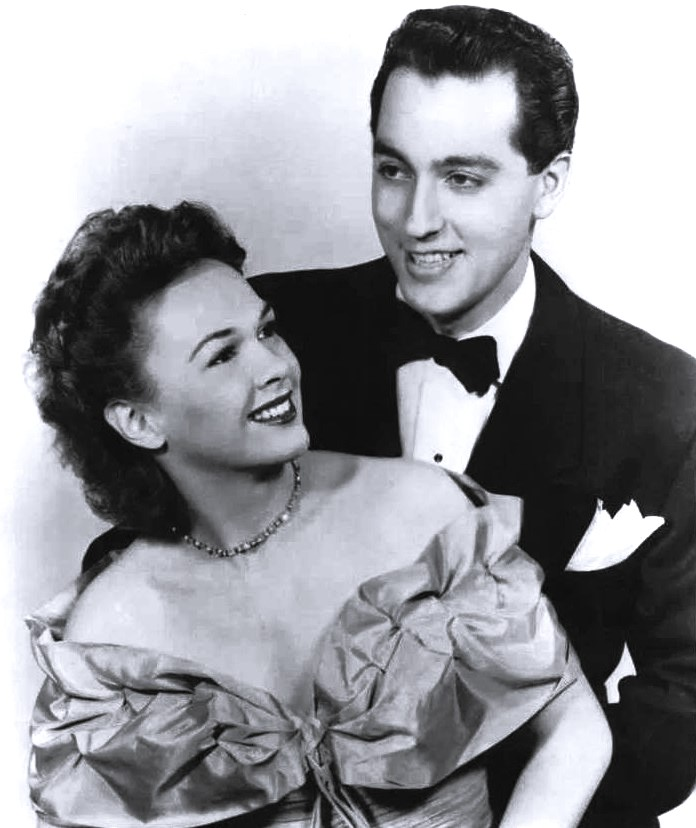
- Betty Jane Watson and Jerry Austen, 1951
- Born: December 28, 1921
- Died: February 21, 2016 (aged 94)
- Occupation: Actress

Elizabeth Jane Watson (December 28, 1921 – February 21, 2016) was an American actress and singer known for her roles in musical theatre, especially Laurey in Oklahoma!, creating the role in the London premiere. She also performed in nightclubs and on television, including as co-host of the game show Winner Take All.

== Early life and marriages ==
Watson was born and raised in Le Roy, Illinois, near Bloomington, the daughter of James R. Watson and his wife Elizabeth Jane, née Stapleton. She attended Lincoln Junior High School in Rockford, Illinois, and later the American Conservatory of Music, in Chicago, where she majored in vocal performance. Her cousin was Jean Stapleton. In 1944, she married actor Gerald L. Austensen (1924–2007), who performed with her in nightclub acts. The couple had three children, Cynthia Ruhlig, Deena Court and Deborah Austensen Martin. They divorced in 1961. In 1962 she married Salvatore Santacroce.

== Career ==
Watson met Tony Martin at age 16, while she was performing in Chicago at radio station WROK. He immediately invited her to sing with his band the same evening. After her family moved to Chicago, she continued to sing with bands at clubs and hotels, including at the Palmer House.

She made her first appearance on Broadway in early 1944 as Gertie in Oklahoma! and as understudy for Laurey and performed during the same period at the Cotillion Room at the Pierre Hotel. In June 1944, she became the replacement for Laurey, subsequently toured in the role for over a year and then rejoined the Broadway company. In 1946, she starred in Toplitzky of Notre Dame. A reviewer for The Billboard praised Watson, writing: "did a sock job with all her numbers", even though he did not like the show. The following year, she originated Laurey in the West End production of Oklahoma!. In 1948, she played Katrina Van Tassel in the Broadway musical Sleepy Hollow and appeared in the revue Hilarities. Of her performance as Katrina, The Billboard commented that she "puts plenty of flirtatious appeal into her Dutch heroine, and is tops vocally. In the Broadway show As the Girls Go, at the Winter Garden Theatre in 1948, she originated the role of Kathy Robinson. The next year, she was a replacement in Texas, Li'l Darlin' on Broadway.

In 1958, Watson played the title role Off-Broadway at New York City Center in Annie Get Your Gun. In 1961, she replaced Lucille Ball in the lead of Wildcat and played Maimie (and understudied Mimi) on Broadway in Sail Away. She appeared in regional theatre roles in musicals including South Pacific (1955, 1963), The Pajama Game (1958), and Annie Get Your Gun (1961), and in nightclubs in the 1950s and 1960s. She also appeared at a benefit in Carnegie Hall. Among her television appearances, she was a co-host of the game show Winner Take All and appeared on Ed Sullivan's Toast of the Town and The Morey Amsterdam Show. She was a guest star on the TV series Suspense in 1953.

== Death ==
Watson died in Florida in 2016 at the age of 94. She was buried on February 27, 2016, in Pompano Beach, Florida.
