= Herbert Greene (Broadway conductor) =

American conductor and arranger (1921–1985)

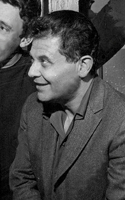
- Greene backstage at Anyone Can Whistle, 1964
- Born: June 16, 1921; Brooklyn, New York City, U.S.
- Died: September 25, 1985 (aged 64); New York City, U.S.
- Occupations: Conductor, arranger, music director, singer
- Spouse: Carolyn Jones (m. 1968; div. 1977)

Herbert Greene (June 16, 1921 – September 25, 1985) was an American conductor, music director and vocal arranger prominent on the Broadway stage in New York City. He won two Tony Awards for the 1958 musical The Music Man.

== Biography ==
=== Early life ===
Greene was born on June 16, 1921, in Brooklyn, New York. As a boy, he studied to be an opera singer with Thomas LoMonaco, a protégé of the well-known vocal scientist, Dr. Douglas Stanley. Mr. Greene also aspired to be a composer. He had a body of serious compositions: his Sonata for Cello and Piano was performed in New York City, and The White Notes, a series of piano pieces, was published.

=== Career ===
Greene's career began prodigiously: accepted to sing the lead role in a radio performance of Beethoven's Fidelio for Arturo Toscanini, and to sing in the chorus in Leonard Bernstein's 1944 Broadway musical On the Town, he chose the latter. He was given only a walk-on role, but his rendition of New York City's mayor Fiorello LaGuardia brought the house down, so when a replacement was needed for the lead, they offered it to Greene, who turned it down. Instead, Greene (who had no training in conducting a live show with recordings) asked Bernstein if he could conduct the show. Bernstein, impressed by the 23-year-old's audacity and convinced that he was a conductor, auditioned him and made him the conductor of matinees. When Bernstein left On the Town, Greene took over as conductor.

Greene was the conductor, music director or vocal arranger of a dozen other Broadway shows, including "Guys and Dolls" and "The Most Happy Fella" for Frank Loesser. In addition to being a singer, actor, conductor and arranger, he was well known as a "voice doctor" who could take a film or stage actor and make a Broadway singer of him or her. According to his obituary in The New York Times, many Hollywood stars, wishing to learn to sing before performing on Broadway, came to Greene for help. Rex Harrison, Rosalind Russell, Angela Lansbury, Barbara Cook, Robert Preston, Don Ameche, and Judy Holliday were among them. Several students also studied with him, including Mabel Madison Watson.

In 1958, he received two Tony Awards for The Music Man, one as musical director and conductor and one as producer.

=== Personal life ===
Greene was married three times: first to the performing pianist, accompanist and piano pedagog, Lucy Greene, until their divorce in 1959; then for nine years to Norma Geist, owner of Rockaways' Playland; and last to actress Carolyn Jones. He had two children by Lucy Greene. He lived in New York City until 1966, when he moved to Los Angeles to work in the film industry. He returned to New York City to resume work on the Broadway stage in 1982 and died there on September 25, 1985.

== Tony Award wins ==
For Musical Director and Conductor:

- 1958 The Music Man

For Producer:

- 1958 The Music Man

== Tony Award nominations ==
For Conductor and Musical Director:

- 1957 The Most Happy Fella
- 1958 The Music Man

For Musical Director:

- 1962 The Gay Life

For Producer:

- 1958 The Music Man
