= As the Girls Go =

1948 musical

- Original Broadway playbill
- Music: Jimmy McHugh
- Lyrics: Harold Adamson
- Book: William Roos
- Productions: 1948 Broadway

As the Girls Go is a musical with music by Jimmy McHugh, lyrics by Harold Adamson and a book by William Roos.

After an out-of-town tryout at the Opera House in Boston in October 1948, the original Broadway production of As the Girls Go opened at the Winter Garden Theatre on November 13, 1948, transferred to The Broadway Theatre and ran for a total of 420 performances. The production was directed by Howard Bay, choreographed by Hermes Pan and produced by Michael Todd. It starred Bobby Clark and Irene Rich and featured Hobart Cavanaugh, Betty Jane Watson (replaced by Fran Warren), June Kirby, Jo Sullivan, and Pauline Hahn. A teenaged Abbe Lane, billed as Abbe Marshall, was in the ensemble. The production's musical director, Max Meth won a Tony Award for his work.

== Synopsis ==
In 1953 (four years ahead), a woman (Lucille Thompson Wellington) is elected President of the United States. The First Husband (Waldo Wellington) gets around town quite a bit, presiding at events, receiving honorary degrees, and making a mess of protocol. The first female president's foes try to cook up a scandal by throwing women into the path of the flirty First Spouse, but they have no luck.

== Musical numbers ==
Act I

- As the Girls Go - Waldo Wellington, Max Wellington and Girls
- Nobody's Heart But Mine - Kathy Robinson and Kenny Wellington
- Brighten Up and Be a Little Sunbeam - Waldo Wellington, Max Wellington and Children
- Rock, Rock, Rock - Kenny Wellington, Max Wellington and Kathy Robinson
- It's More Fun Than a Picnic - Mickey Wellington, Max Wellington and Children
- American Cannes - Waldo Wellington and Girls
- You Say the Nicest Things, Baby - Kathy Robinson, Kenny Wellington and Singing Girls
- I've Got the President's Ear - Waldo Wellington and Girls
- Holiday in the Country - Entire Company

Act II

- There's No Getting Away from You - Kathy Robinson and Singing, Dancing Ensemble
- Lucky in the Rain - Kenny Wellington, Kathy Robinson and Ensemble
- Father's Day - Waldo, Lucille, Kenny, Mickey and Tommy Wellington
- It Takes a Woman to Get a Man - Waldo Wellington and Ensemble
- You Say the Nicest Things, Baby (Reprise) - Waldo Wellington and Lucille Thompson Wellington
