= Sail Away (musical) =

Musical by Noël Coward

- Sheet music (cover)
- Music: Noël Coward
- Lyrics: Noël Coward
- Book: Noël Coward
- Productions: 1961 Broadway; 1962 West End; 1998 Woking, England revival

Sail Away is a musical with a book, music and lyrics by Noël Coward. The show was the last musical for which Coward wrote both the book and music, although he wrote the music for one last book musical in 1963.

The story centres on brash, bold American divorcee Mimi Paragon, working as a hostess on a British cruise ship. The musical ran on Broadway (1961) and in the West End (1962) and has been revived since. Elaine Stritch was nominated for the Tony Award for Best Actress in a Musical for her performance in the original production.

== Background ==
Elaine Stritch started in the show in a "relatively minor role and was only promoted over the title and given virtually all the best songs when it was reckoned that the leading lady...although excellent, was rather too operatic for a musical comedy." During out-of-town tryouts in Boston, Coward was "unsure about the dramatic talents" of one of the leads, opera singer Jean Fenn. "They were, after all, engaged for their voices and...it is madness to expect two singers to play subtle 'Noel Coward' love scenes with the right values and sing at the same time." Joe Layton suggested "What would happen if ...we just eliminated [Fenn's] role and gave everything to Stritch? ...The show was very old-fashioned, and the thing that was working was Elaine Stritch...every time she went on stage [she] was a sensation. The reconstructed 'Sail Away'...opened in New York on 3 October."

According to Ben Brantley, "Coward wrote in his diary that Ms. Stritch sang 'so movingly that I almost cried.' He went on to say about making her the show's star: 'There is no doubt about it. I made the right decision.'"

== Synopsis ==
The show is set aboard the British luxury cruise ship Coronia bound for the Mediterranean in 1961. The plot involves a romantic love affair aboard a cruise ship, with all the classic wit and charm of Broadway's golden era. Recent divorcée Mimi Paragon is stuck serving tourists as a hostess when she is drawn to the much younger and strikingly handsome Johnny Van Mier. Complicating their relationship are several eccentric characters, from the cynical and quirky Sweeneys to Johnny's dominating and diva-like mother, Mrs. Van Mier; to the wacky novelist Spencer Bollard and her wide-eyed niece, Nancy.

== Original cast and characters ==
Character	Broadway (1961)	West End (1962)
Mimi Paragon	Elaine Stritch	Elaine Stritch
John Van Mier	James Hurst	David Holliday
Mrs. Van Mier	Margalo Gillmore	Mavis Villiers
Elinor Spencer-Bollard	Alice Pearce	Dorothy Reynolds
Nancy Foyle	Patricia Harty	Sheila Forbes
Barnaby Slade	Grover Dale	Grover Dale
Joe / Ali	Charles Braswell	John Hewer
Mrs. Lush	Evelyn Russell	Margaret Christensen
Alvin Lush	Paul O'Keefe	Stephen Ashworth
Maimie Candijack	Betty Jane Watson	Stella Moray
Mrs. Sweeney	Paula Bauersmith	Edith Day

== Songs ==
Act I

- "Come to Me" – Mimi Paragon and Stewards
- "Sail Away" – John Van Mier
- "Where Shall I Find Him?" – Nancy Foyle
- "Beatnik Love Affair" – Barnaby Slade, Nancy and the Passengers
- "Later Than Spring" – John
- "The Passenger’s Always Right" – Joe and Stewards
- "Useless, Useful Phrases" – Mimi
- "Go Slow, Johnny" – John
- "You’re a Long, Long Way from America" – Mimi and Company

Act II

- "The Customer’s Always Right" – Ali and the Arabs
- "Something Very Strange" – Mimi
- "The Little Ones' ABC" – Mimi, Alvin Lush and the Children
- "Don’t Turn Away from Love" – John
- "When You Want Me" – Barnaby and Nancy
- "Why Do the Wrong People Travel" – Mimi
- "When You Want Me" (Reprise) – The Company

A song titled "The Bronxville Darby and Joan" was added for the London production.

== Productions ==
Sail Away had out-of-town tryouts for three weeks each in Boston and Philadelphia. The show opened on Broadway on 3 October 1961, at the Broadhurst Theatre and closed on 24 February 1962 after 167 performances. It was directed by Coward (the last of his works that he directed) and choreographed by Joe Layton with scenic design by Oliver Smith, costumes by Helene Pons and Oliver Smith, and lighting by Peggy Clark.

The show was then staged at the Savoy Theatre in the West End in 1962, where it opened on 21 June and ran for 252 performances, until 26 January 1963, directed by Coward. The musical was then produced, with Coward's personal directorial attention, in Melbourne in 1963, starring Maggie Fitzgibbon.

It was revived at the Rhoda McGaw Theatre in Woking, England in 1998. Gerald Gutierrez directed a November 1999 staged concert version in the Weill Recital Hall of Carnegie Hall, starring Stritch. A concert version played in July 2008 at Sadler's Wells' Lilian Baylis Theatre, directed by Ian Marshall Fisher in the Lost Musicals series, starring Penny Fuller as Mimi, Vivienne Martin as Mrs. Van Mier, and Rupert Young as John.

Not only did Coward write the book, music and lyrics, and also direct the show, he even designed the show poster. Some of its songs are well known, including "Why Do the Wrong People Travel?" "Useless, Useful Phrases", "The Customer's Always Right" and the title song. The song "Sail Away" was first used by Coward in his 1950 musical Ace of Clubs.
