= No Strings =

Musical drama by Samuel A. Taylor and Richard Rodgers

- Original London Cast Recording
- Music: Richard Rodgers
- Lyrics: Richard Rodgers
- Book: Samuel A. Taylor
- Productions: 1962 Broadway; 1963 West End; 2003 Concert Production
- Awards: Tony Award for Best Composer

No Strings is a musical drama with book by Samuel A. Taylor and words and music by Richard Rodgers. No Strings is the only Broadway score for which Rodgers wrote both lyrics and music, and the first musical he composed after the death of his long-time collaborator, Oscar Hammerstein II. The musical opened on Broadway in 1962 and ran for 580 performances. It received six Tony Award nominations, winning three, for Best Leading Actress in a Musical, Best Original Score and Best Choreography.

== Productions ==
The world premiere of No Strings was at the O'Keefe Centre (now Meridian Hall) in Toronto. The U.S. premiere was at the Fisher Theater in Detroit, where the show ran from January 15 to February 3, 1962.

The musical opened on March 15, 1962, at the 54th Street Theatre in New York. It ran for slightly more than six months before transferring to the Broadhurst Theatre, where it continued until August of the following year, for a total of 580 performances and one preview. Joe Layton was both director and choreographer, with Diahann Carroll and Richard Kiley starring. Carroll won a Tony Award for Best Actress in a Musical, a first for an African-American. Barbara McNair and Howard Keel replaced them later in the run.

In December 1963, an equally successful production in London, starring Art Lund and Beverly Todd, opened at Her Majesty's Theatre.

In 2003, a staged concert production was held at New York City Center as a part of its Encores! series. This production starred James Naughton and Maya Days and was directed and choreographed by Ann Reinking.

== Background ==
The civil rights movement — voter registration for Black people, integration, and fairness and equality in the workplace — was starting to gain momentum in the United States in the early 1960s, but it was a topic largely absent on Broadway. Neither the book nor score make specific mention of race, nor does it impact upon any decisions made by the couple, but Rodgers has addressed the issue. Other than the model’s reference to growing up north of Central Park (seemingly an allusion to Harlem), there is nothing in the script to suggest she is African-American. It was only in the casting of Carroll and Richard Kiley as the star-crossed lovers that the subject of interracial romance surfaced. Any production of the show easily could be cast with two leads of the same race without changing the content in any significant way. Nevertheless, the casting was socially progressive at the time.

Rodgers got the idea for casting a Black actress in the star role after viewing Diahann Carroll on The Tonight Show.

He felt that the casting spoke for itself and any specific references to race in the play were unnecessary. Rodgers said: "Rather than shrinking from the issue of race, such an approach would demonstrate our respect for the audience's ability to accept our theme free from rhetoric or sermons."

However, the characters' reluctance to discuss race was controversial.

== Synopsis ==
Fashion model Barbara Woodruff, living in Paris, meets and falls in love with expatriate American David Jordan, a Pulitzer Prize-winning novelist who has suffered from an intense case of writer's block since his arrival in France. She attempts to restore his confidence in his creativity, but the easy life he's enjoying, flitting about Monte Carlo, Honfleur, Deauville, and St. Tropez, is too much of a distraction. Concluding that he can work only if he returns home to Maine, he invites her to go with him; but she realizes she could never have the freedom she enjoys living in Paris. Recognizing they have no future together, they part with "no strings" attached.

== Reception ==
Critics gave high praise to Rodgers' music and the show's production, while acknowledging some weaknesses in the libretto. Daily News writer John Chapman described the show as "a somber, offbeat affair." New York Times critic Howard Taubman thought the show became "sticky" in the second half but "recovers with a final scene of honest feeling."

== Cast ==
Original Broadway Cast:

- Diahann Carroll - Barbara Woodruff
- Richard Kiley - David Jordan
- Noëlle Adam - Jeanette Valmy
- Don Chastain - Mike Robinson
- Alvin Epstein - Luc Delbert
- Mitchell Gregg - Louis dePourtal
- Bernice Massi - Comfort O'Connell
- Polly Rowles - Mollie Plummer
- Paul Cambeilh - Marcello Agnolotti
- Ann Hodges - Gabrielle Bertin

== Song list ==
=== Act I ===
- "The Sweetest Sounds" - Barbara, David
- "How Sad" - David
- "Loads of Love" - Barbara
- "The Man Who Has Everything" - Louis
- "Be My Host" - David, Comfort, Mike, Luc, Gabrielle
- "La La La" - Jeanette, Luc
- "You Don't Tell Me" - Barbara
- "Love Makes the World Go" - Mollie, Comfort
- "Nobody Told Me" - David, Barbara

=== Act II ===
- "Look No Further" - David, Barbara
- "Maine" - David, Barbara
- "An Orthodox Fool" - Barbara
- "Eager Beaver" - Comfort, Mike
- "No Strings" - David, Barbara
- "Maine (Reprise)" - Barbara, David
- "The Sweetest Sounds" - David, Barbara

The score was arranged and orchestrated without string instruments to underscore the show's title.

== Recorded versions ==
The success of the Broadway production led to three album versions released in 1962. In a year when musical theater recordings proved to be commercially unsuccessful, No Strings recordings were among the few that did well.

=== Original Broadway cast recording ===
The Broadway cast recording was released in March by Capitol Records and reached fifth place on the charts during its year-long run and won the Best Original Cast Show Album Grammy Award. Billboard recommended the album to work to retailers as a "delightful score" that deserved "equal acclaim" to the stage production and Editors at AllMusic rated this album 3.5 out of 5 stars, with critic William Ruhlmann writing that this is a "strong cast".

=== Richard Rodgers’ No Strings. An After‐Theatre Version ===
Richard Rodgers’ No Strings. An After‐Theatre Version is a jazz album with tracks by LaVern Baker, Chris Connor, Herbie Mann, and Bobby Short released in April and promoted it with several singles. Billboard reviewed this album as a "strong sales potential" release with "interesting versions" of the songs that they recommend for younger record buyers. Editors at AllMusic rated this album 3.5 out of 5 stars, with critic William Ruhlmann writing it was appropriate for Atlantic Records to adapt the big band sound to that of several jazz performers at a night club.

All songs written by Richard Rodgers.

1. "The Sweetest Sounds" by Chris Connor – 2:34
2. "Be My Host" by Bobby Short – 2:26
3. "You Don't Tell Me" by LaVern Baker – 2:56
4. "The Man Who Has Everything" by Bobby Short – 2:21
5. "Look No Further" by Chris Connor – 3:42
6. "Eager Beaver" by LaVern Baker – 2:10
7. "Loads of Love" by LaVern Baker – 2:25
8. "La La La" by Herbie Mann – 2:36
9. "An Orthodox Fool" by Bobby Short – 2:36
10. "Nobody Told Me" by Chris Connor – 3:19
11. "Love Makes the World Go" by Bobby Short – 2:31
12. "No Strings" by Chris Connor – 2:37

Personnel include:

- LaVern Baker – vocals
- Al Cohn – arrangement
- Chris Connor – vocals
- Tom Dowd – engineering
- Nesuhi Ertegun – supervision of analog tape transfers
- Loring Eutemey – artwork
- Stanley Green – liner notes
- Phil Iehle – engineering
- Herbie Mann – flute
- Bobby Short – piano, vocals

=== Sweetest Swingin' Sounds of 'No Strings' ===
A third album was released in May by Capitol, recorded by big band trumpeter Billy May. Billboard speculated that it would be a "potent seller" that was "full of the wit and beat" that characterized May's work and the album was re-released on CD in 1999 in a package with the album The Girls and Boys on Broadway; editors at AllMusic scored this compilation 4 out of 5 stars.

All songs written by Richard Rodgers.

1. "No Strings" – 1:59
2. "The Sweetest Sounds" – 1:47
3. "Love Makes the World Go" – 1:45
4. "Nobody Told Me" – 2:05
5. "Loads of Love" – 2:15
6. "Maine" – 2:13
7. "Eager Beaver" – 2:20
8. "Look No Further" – 2:02
9. "An Orthodox Fool" – 1:30
10. "La La La" – 2:23
11. "The Man Who Has Everything" – 2:15
12. "Be My Host" – 2:09

== Awards and nominations ==
Accolades for the original Broadway production of No Strings
Year	Award	Category	Nominee	Result
1962	Tony Award	Best Musical		Nominated
1962	Tony Award	Best Original Score	Richard Rodgers	Won
1962	Tony Award	Best Performance by a Leading Actor in a Musical	Richard Kiley	Nominated
1962	Tony Award	Best Performance by a Leading Actress in a Musical	Diahann Carroll	Won
1962	Tony Award	Best Direction of a Musical	Joe Layton	Nominated
1962	Tony Award	Best Choreography	Joe Layton	Won
1962	Tony Award	Best Conductor and Musical Director	Peter Matz	Nominated
1962	Tony Award	Best Scenic Design	David Hays	Nominated
1962	Tony Award	Best Costume Design	Donald Brooks	Nominated
1963	Grammy Award	Best Original Cast Show Album	Richard Rodgers	Won
