= 10th Tony Awards =

1956 US theatrical awards ceremony

- Date: April 1, 1956
- Location: Plaza Hotel; New York City
- Hosted by: Jack Carter
- Most wins: Damn Yankees (7)
- Most nominations: Damn Yankees and Pipe Dream (9)

Television/radio coverage
- Network: DuMont Television Network

The 10th Annual Tony Awards took place at the Plaza Hotel Grand Ballroom on April 1, 1956. The Master of Ceremonies was Jack Carter.

== Eligibility ==
Shows that opened on Broadway during the 1955 season before February 29, 1956 are eligible.

Original plays

- Almost Crazy
- Bus Stop
- The Carefree Tree
- Cat on a Hot Tin Roof
- The Chalk Garden
- Champagne Complex
- A Day by the Sea
- Deadfall
- Debut
- The Desk Set
- The Diary of Anne Frank
- The Great Sebastians
- A Hatful of Rain
- The Heavenly Twins
- The Honeys
- The Hot Corner
- Inherit the Wind
- The Innkeepers
- Island of Goats
- Janus
- The Lark
- The Matchmaker
- A Memory of Two Mondays
- Middle of the Night
- No Time for Sergeants
- Once Upon a Tailor
- Paul Draper
- The Ponder Heart
- Red Roses for Me
- The Righteous Are Bold
- A Roomful of Roses
- Someone Waiting
- The Terrible Swift Sword
- Tiger at the Gates
- Time Limit!
- 27 Wagons Full of Cotton
- A View from the Bridge
- Will Success Spoil Rock Hunter?
- The Wooden Dish
- The Young and Beautiful

Original musicals

- Ankles Aweigh
- Catch a Star!
- Damn Yankees
- Hear! Hear!
- Joyce Grenfell Requests the Pleasure...
- Pipe Dream
- Phoenix '55
- Seventh Heaven
- 3 for Tonight
- Trouble in Tahiti
- The Vamp

Play revivals

- Arlequin poli par l'amour
- The Barber of Seville
- Fallen Angels
- Le Jeu de l'Amour et du Hasard
- King Lear
- Le Bourgeois gentilhomme
- Six Characters in Search of an Author
- The Skin of Our Teeth
- A Streetcar Named Desire
- Tamburlaine the Great
- Un caprice

Musical revivals

- Finian's Rainbow
- Guys and Dolls
- H.M.S. Pinafore
- Iolanthe
- The Mikado
- Once Over Lightly
- The Pirates of Penzance
- Princess Ida
- Ruddigore
- South Pacific
- The Threepenny Opera
- Trial by Jury
- The Yeomen of the Guard

== Ceremony ==
The presenter was Helen Hayes, who was President of the American Theatre Wing, and several of the nominees. Jack Carter was host for the first part of the ceremony, and Helen Hayes hosted the second part. More than 500 people attended the dinner dance.

For the first time, the ceremony was broadcast on television, on the DuMont Channel 5 in New York City, in an effort to create "wider public interest in Broadway's most important award-giving ceremony". Also for the first time, the nominees were announced ahead of the ceremony.

Music for the dinner dance was by Meyer Davis and his Orchestra.

== Winners and nominees ==
Sources:Infoplease; BroadwayWorld

| Best Play | Best Musical |
|---|---|
| The Diary of Anne Frank – Frances Goodrich & Albert Hackett; Bus Stop – William Inge; Cat on a Hot Tin Roof – Tennessee Williams; The Chalk Garden – Enid Bagnold; Tiger at the Gates – Jean Giraudoux with English version by Christopher Fry | Damn Yankees; Pipe Dream |
| Best Performance by a Leading Actor in a Play | Best Performance by a Leading Actress in a Play |
| Paul Muni – Inherit the Wind as Henry Drummond; Ben Gazzara – A Hatful of Rain as Johnny Pope; Boris Karloff – The Lark as Pierre Cauchon; Michael Redgrave – Tiger at the Gates as Hector; Edward G. Robinson – Middle of the Night as The Manufacturer | Julie Harris – The Lark as Joan of Arc; Barbara Bel Geddes – Cat on a Hot Tin Roof as Maggie Pollitt; Gladys Cooper – The Chalk Garden as Mrs. St. Maugham; Ruth Gordon – The Matchmaker as Dolly Gallagher Levi; Siobhán McKenna – The Chalk Garden as Miss Madrigal; Susan Strasberg – The Diary of Anne Frank as Anne Frank |
| Best Performance by a Leading Actor in a Musical | Best Performance by a Leading Actress in a Musical |
| Ray Walston – Damn Yankees as Mr. Applegate; Stephen Douglass – Damn Yankees as Joe Hardy; William Johnson – Pipe Dream as Doc | Gwen Verdon – Damn Yankees as Lola; Carol Channing – The Vamp as Flora Weems; Nancy Walker – Phoenix '55 as Various Characters |
| Best Performance by a Supporting or Featured Actor in a Play | Best Performance by a Supporting or Featured Actress in a Play |
| Ed Begley – Inherit the Wind as Matthew Harrison Brady; Anthony Franciosa – A Hatful of Rain as Polo Pope; Andy Griffith – No Time for Sergeants as Will Stockdale; Anthony Quayle – Tamburlaine the Great as Tamburlaine; Fritz Weaver – The Chalk Garden as Maitland | Una Merkel – The Ponder Heart as Edna Earle Ponder; Diane Cilento – Tiger at the Gates as Helen of Troy; Anne Jackson – Middle of the Night as The Daughter; Elaine Stritch – Bus Stop as Grace Hoylard |
| Best Performance by a Supporting or Featured Actor in a Musical | Best Performance by a Supporting or Featured Actress in a Musical |
| Russ Brown – Damn Yankees as Benny Van Buren; Mike Kellin – Pipe Dream as Hazel; Will Mahoney – Finian's Rainbow as Finian McLonergan; Scott Merrill – The Threepenny Opera as Macheath | Lotte Lenya – The Threepenny Opera as Jenny Diver; Rae Allen – Damn Yankees as Gloria Thorpe; Pat Carroll – Catch a Star! as Various Characters; Judy Tyler – Pipe Dream as Suzy |
| Best Director | Best Choreography |
| Tyrone Guthrie – The Matchmaker; Joseph Anthony – The Lark; Harold Clurman – Bus Stop / Pipe Dream / Tiger at the Gates; Tyrone Guthrie – The Matchmaker / Six Characters in Search of an Author / Tamburlaine the Great; Garson Kanin – The Diary of Anne Frank; Elia Kazan – Cat on a Hot Tin Roof; Albert Marre – The Chalk Garden; Herman Shumlin – Inherit the Wind | Bob Fosse – Damn Yankees; Robert Alton – The Vamp; Boris Runanin – Phoenix '55 / Pipe Dream; Anna Sokolow – Red Roses for Me |
| Best Scenic Design | Best Costume Design |
| Peter Larkin – Inherit the Wind / No Time for Sergeants; Boris Aronson – The Diary of Anne Frank / Bus Stop / Once Upon a Tailor / A View from the Bridge; Ben Edwards – The Honeys / The Ponder Heart / Someone Waiting; Jo Mielziner - Cat on a Hot Tin Roof / The Lark / Middle of the Night / Pipe Dream; Raymond Sovey – The Great Sebastians | Alvin Colt – Pipe Dream; Alvin Colt – The Lark / Phoenix '55 / Pipe Dream; Mainbocher – The Great Sebastians; Helene Pons – The Diary of Anne Frank / The Heavenly Twins / A View from the Bridge |
| Best Conductor and Musical Director | Best Stage Technician |
| Hal Hastings – Damn Yankees; Salvatore Dell'Isola – Pipe Dream; Milton Rosenstock – The Vamp | Harry Green, electrician and sound man – Damn Yankees / Middle of the Night; Larry Bland, carpenter – Middle of the Night / The Ponder Heart / Porgy and Bess |

=== Multiple nominations and awards ===
These productions had multiple nominations:

- 9 nominations: Damn Yankees and Pipe Dream
- 5 nominations: The Chalk Garden, The Diary of Anne Frank, The Lark and Middle of the Night
- 4 nominations: Bus Stop, Cat on a Hot Tin Roof, Inherit the Wind and Tiger at the Gates
- 3 nominations: Phoenix '55, The Ponder Heart and The Vamp
- 2 nominations: The Great Sebastians, A Hatful of Rain, The Matchmaker, No Time for Sergeants, Tamburlaine the Great, The Threepenny Opera and A View from the Bridge

The following productions received multiple awards.

- 7 wins: Damn Yankees
- 3 wins: Inherit the Wind

Note: The Threepenny Opera also received a Special Tony Award.

== Special awards ==
- City Center
- Fourth Street Chekov Theatre, off-Broadway production company (Three Sisters, The Cherry Orchard, and Uncle Vanya) directed and produced by David Ross
- The Shakespearewrights, off-Broadway production company (Romeo and Juliet, Macbeth) produced by Donald H. Goldman at the Jan Hus Auditorium
- The Threepenny Opera, distinguished Off-Broadway production
- The Theatre Collection of the New York Public Library on its twenty-fifth anniversary, for its distinguished service to the theatre.

== See also ==
- 28th Academy Awards
