= Eisenstein =

Eisenstein may refer to:

== Places ==
- Bayerisch Eisenstein, (until 1951 just Eisenstein) a village and a municipality in the Regen district, in Bavaria, Germany
- Eisenstein (Ore Mountains), a mountain in Saxony, Germany
- Eisenstein, Wisconsin, a town in the United States

== Other uses ==
- Eisenstein (surname)
- Eisenstein (film), a 2000 Canadian biography of Sergei Eisenstein
- Eisenstein, a fictional spacecraft in The Flight of the Eisenstein by James Swallow

== See also ==
- Einstein (disambiguation)
