= Eisenstein (surname) =

Eisenstein is a surname which may refer to:

- Bruce Eisenstein, American electrical engineer and academic
- Charles Eisenstein, American author, speaker and activist
- Daniel Eisenstein (born 1970), American cosmologist and academic
- Elizabeth Eisenstein (1923–2016), American historian
- Gotthold Eisenstein (1823–1852), German mathematician
- Ira Eisenstein (1906–2001), American rabbi who cofounded Reconstructionist Judaism
- James P. Eisenstein (born 1952), American physicist
- Julius Eisenstein (1854–1956), Russian-American writer and contributor to the Jewish Encyclopedia
- Laura Eisenstein (1942–1985), American physicist
- Linda Eisenstein, American playwright and composer
- Mayer Eisenstein (1946–2014), American physician and anti-vaccine activist
- Mikhail Eisenstein (1867–1921), Russian architect
- Odile Eisenstein (born 1949), French theoretical chemist
- Phyllis Eisenstein (1946–2020), American science fiction and fantasy writer
- Sergei Eisenstein (1898–1948), Soviet film director
- Zillah Eisenstein, (fl. 2021) American political scientist and gender studies scholar
