= It Shouldn't Happen to a Dog =

1946 film

- Directed by: Herbert I. Leeds
- Written by: Edwin Lanham; Eugene Ling; Frank Gabrielson
- Produced by: William Girard
- Starring: Carole Landis; Allyn Joslyn; Margo Woode; Harry Morgan
- Cinematography: Glen MacWilliams
- Edited by: Robert Fritch
- Music by: David Buttolph
- Production company: 20th Century Fox
- Distributed by: 20th Century Fox
- Release date: August 26, 1946
- Running time: 70 minutes
- Country: United States
- Language: English
- Box office: $800,000

It Shouldn't Happen to a Dog is a 1946 American comedy crime film starring Carole Landis, Allyn Joslyn and Margo Woode, and directed by Herbert I. Leeds.

== Plot ==
After returning from World War II, a journalist is assigned by his newspaper to be science editor when he wishes to be restored to his old job as a crime reporter. While drowning his sorrows in a bar, he sees what he believes to be a hold-up involving a beautiful young woman and her dog. He triggers a major manhunt after calling in the story to his newsdesk, before realizing that the woman is both innocent and a serving member of the police. Together with her - who is assigned to the same case he is working on - they are able to bring the Valentine gang of criminals to justice.

== Cast ==
- Carole Landis as Julia Andrews
- Allyn Joslyn as Henry Barton
- Margo Woode as Olive Stone
- Harry Morgan as Gus Rivers
- Reed Hadley as Mike Valentine
- Jean Wallace as Bess Williams
- Roy Roberts as 'Mitch' Mitchell
- John Ireland as Benny Smith
- John Alexander as Joe Parelli
- Whit Bissell as Chester Frye

== Bibliography ==
- Fleming, E.J. Carole Landis: A Tragic Life in Hollywood. McFarland, 2005.
