= Bop Girl Goes Calypso =

1957 film by Howard W. Koch

- Directed by: Howard W. Koch
- Written by: Arnold Belgard; Hendrik Vollaerts
- Produced by: Aubrey Schenck
- Starring: Judy Tyler; Bobby Troup; Margo Woode
- Cinematography: Carl E. Guthrie
- Edited by: Sam E. Waxman
- Music by: Les Baxter
- Production companies: Bel-Air Productions; Clark Productions
- Distributed by: United Artists
- Release date: July 1957
- Running time: 80 minutes
- Country: United States
- Language: English

Bop Girl Goes Calypso is a 1957 American United Artists film directed by Howard W. Koch and starring Judy Tyler. It features calypso music by the Bobby Troup Trio and bassist Jim Aton.

== Plot ==
Working on a thesis, college student Bob Hilton performs research while predicting that calypso music will be the next craze, replacing rock and roll. When he and Professor Winthrop visit a nightclub where Jo Thomas is the featured singer, Jo mocks Bob's theory until he takes her to another club and piques her interest.

Bob's interest in music and in Jo is frustrating to Marion Hendricks, his impatient fiancée. Jo adds a calypso number to her repertoire, causing friction between the club's owner and Bob, resulting in a fight. But the audience's enthusiastic reaction to the song causes the nightclub to be renamed Club Trinidad with a new musical theme. Marion breaks up with Bob but attracts the romantic interest of the professor.

== Cast ==
- Judy Tyler as Jo Thomas
- Bobby Troup as Robert Hilton
- Margo Woode as Marion Hendricks
- Lucien Littlefield as Professor Winthrop

== See also ==
- List of American films of 1957
