= Iron Angel (film) =

- Film poster
- Directed by: Ken Kennedy
- Written by: Ken Kennedy
- Produced by: Daniel P. Foley (producer); Ken Kennedy (executive producer)
- Starring: See below
- Cinematography: Murray De'Atley
- Edited by: Murray De'Atley
- Production company: Ken Kennedy Productions
- Distributed by: Crown International Pictures
- Release date: 1964
- Running time: 70 minutes
- Country: United States
- Language: English

Iron Angel is a 1964 American Korean War film co-produced, written and directed by Ken Kennedy. It was shot near Phoenix, Arizona.

== Plot summary ==
A US Army truck convoy is halted by North Korean artillery fire. A Lieutenant is sent out to locate and destroy the enemy's artillery piece with a patrol of picked men including a sergeant the lieutenant feels is a coward. On the way they come across an unconscious US Army Nurse and her ambulance, nicknamed "the Iron Angel". The patrol uses the ambulance to attract the enemy's fire enabling the patrol to engage them.

== Cast ==
- Jim Davis as Sergeant Walsh
- Don "Red" Barry as "Reb"
- L. Q. Jones as "Buttons"
- Margo Woode as Nurse Lieutenant Laura Fleming
- Tristram Coffin as Captain
- R. Wayland Williams as Corporal Walker
- Dave Barker as Private Drake
- Joe Jenckes as Lieutenant Collins
- John Hirohata as Korean Officer
