= Margo Woode =

American actress (1928–2018)

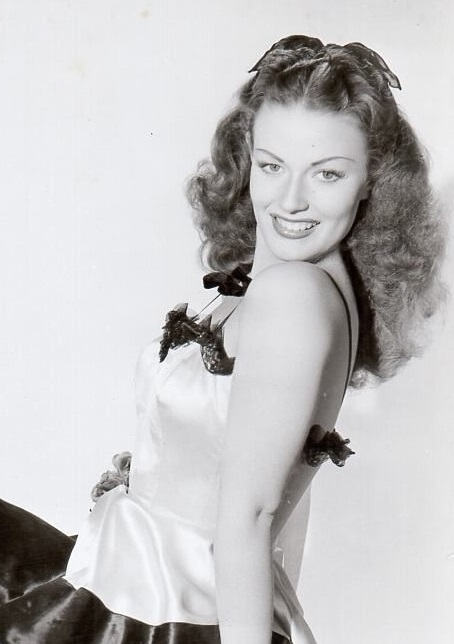
- Born: Valeria Jean Ketcham; April 20, 1928; Phoenix, Arizona, U.S.
- Died: September 28, 2018 (aged 90); Scottsdale, Arizona, U.S.
- Occupation: Actress
- Years active: 1942–1964
- Spouse(s): Bill E. Burton (1947-1958, his death); Ron Beckett (1959-?)

Margo Woode (born Valeria Jean Ketcham, April 20, 1928 – September 28, 2018) was an American actress active in motion pictures and television.

== Early years ==
Woode's parents were Mr. and Mrs. R. C. Ketcham. She graduated from North Phoenix High School.

== Career ==
She was signed by 20th Century Fox in 1942 as a member of the studio's stock company, under the professional name Margo Woode. Her film debut was in Springtime in the Rockies (1942), as a bit player. She left Fox when her one-year contract expired. One day after her release, she appeared on stage in a local production of the play Stage Door, and Fox executive Joseph Schenck reinstated her at the studio. After a year with no films to her credit, her contract again lapsed, but studio chief Darryl F. Zanuck signed her once more in November 1944. Zanuck placed her immediately into the latest Fox production, which served as her screen test: the Laurel and Hardy comedy The Bullfighters (filmed 1944, released 1945). Her small role as a glamour girl (announced by Zanuck as "the feminine lead") is perhaps her most familiar film to today's audiences.

Fox renewed her contract in 1945, and she went on to play featured roles for the studio through 1947. She freelanced for various studios thereafter. Her most prominent roles were as Phyllis in Somewhere in the Night (1946) and as the other woman in the movie musical Bop Girl Goes Calypso (1957). She also appeared on television in the 1950s in such programs as Racket Squad and Dragnet.

== Personal life ==
She married Bill E. Burton, manager of many prominent singers including Dick Haymes and The Andrews Sisters, on July 19, 1947 in Las Vegas, Nevada. They had a son and a daughter. Burton died in 1958, and she married Ron Beckett in 1959, with whom she had a daughter, Gigi.

== Filmography ==
Year	Title	Role	Notes
1942	Springtime in the Rockies	Minor Role	Uncredited
1945	The Bullfighters	Señorita Tangerine	
1945	State Fair	Girl	Uncredited
1945	The Spider	Pretty Woman	(scenes deleted)
1946	Somewhere in the Night	Phyllis	
1946	It Shouldn't Happen to a Dog	Olive Stone	
1946	Wife Wanted	Miss Sheldon	Uncredited
1947	Moss Rose	Daisy Arrow	
1950	No Sad Songs for Me	Doris Weldon	Uncredited
1950	When You're Smiling	Linda Reynolds	
1952	Racket Squad	Kay Wilson	Episode: "One More Dream"
1952	My Hero	Lulubelle	Episode: "The Hillbilly"
1957	Bop Girl Goes Calypso	Marion Hendricks	
1957	Hell Bound	Jan	
1958	The Court of Last Resort		Episode: "The Arnold McHugh Case"
1961	The Touchables	Hilda - Miss Switzerland	
1964	Iron Angel	Nurse Lt. Laura Fleming	(final film role)
