= Edwin Lanham =

American writer

Edwin Moultrie Lanham was born in Weatherford, Texas on October 11, 1904, in the north central part of Texas where his family settled in the 1868. His family included his grandfather S. W. T. Lanham, the former Governor of Texas. His father Edwin Moultrie Lanham Sr., died when Lanham was four, and his mother, Elizabeth Stephens Lanham, remarried soon after and joined her husband in New York City.

Lanham began writing in Paris, France in 1928, and his writing career spanned many decades, and more than twenty novels. Lanham married a model Irene Stillman in 1928 in Clinton, CT, and had one daughter Evelyn (nicknamed Linda) in 1942.

His only books to have received significant levels of literary praise were both written in the 1930s. "The Wind Blew West" is his most critically acclaimed work, and contains a fictional retelling of the Warren Wagon Train Raid of 1871 and the subsequent trial of the Native American defendants. In 1940, Lanham received one of the Guggenheim Fellowships, which funded his novel "Thunder in the Earth". After World War 2, Lanham ceased writing literary fiction, and his entire writing career focused thereafter on mystery writing.

These detective stories, moreover, remain popular among genre fiction readers.

In addition, three of his detective stories were turned into Hollywood films entitled: If I’m Lucky (1946); It Shouldn't Happen to a Dog (1946); and The Senator Was Indiscreet (1947).

Lanham died on July 24, 1979.

== Bibliography ==
- Sailors Don't Care, Contact Edition, Paris, 1929
- Wind Blew West, 1935
- Banner at Daybreak, 1937
- Another Ophelia, 1938
- The Stricklands, 1939
- Thunder in the Earth, 1942
- Politics is Murder, 1947
- Slug It Slay, 1948 ( Published in the UK as Headline for Murder )
- Death of a Corinthian, 1953
- One Murder Too Many, 1953
- The Iron Maiden, 1954
- Murder on My Street, 1958
- Speak Not Evil, 1958
- Six Black Camels, 1961
- Passage to Danger, 1961
- Monkey on a Chain, 1963
- The Clock at 8:16, 1970
