= The Lark (play) =

1952 play by Jean Anouilh

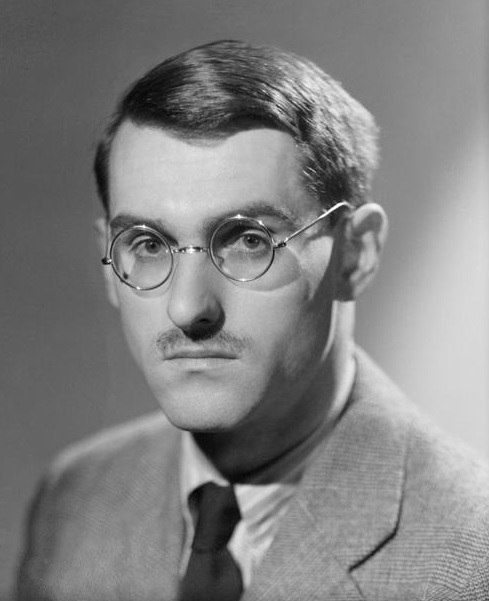
Jean Anouilh c. 1940

The Lark (French: L'Alouette) is a 1952 play about Joan of Arc by the French playwright Jean Anouilh. It was first presented at the Théâtre Montparnasse, Paris in October 1953. Translated into English by Christopher Fry in 1955, it was then adapted by Lillian Hellman for the Broadway production in the same year.

The play premiered in Boston at the Plymouth Theater on October 28, 1955 and opened on Broadway at the Longacre Theatre on November 17, 1955, where it ran for 229 performances, closing on June 2, 1956. Starring Julie Harris as Joan and Boris Karloff as Pierre Cauchon, the cast included; Christopher Plummer as Warwick and Paul Roebling as the Dauphin. It was directed by Joseph Anthony and produced by Kermit Bloomgarden. Leonard Bernstein composed incidental music. The opening night cast remained throughout the entire run, with the sole exception of Christopher Plummer whose character Warwick was taken up by Leo Ciceri.

The two stars of the play reprised their roles in a 1957 television production of the play, as part of the anthology series Hallmark Hall of Fame. In November 1956, the BBC screened their version, with Hazel Penwarden as Joan, and a supporting cast including Michael Caine. A different television adaptation aired in 1958 in Australia.

The first English adaptation of the play was by Christopher Fry. Produced by Tennent Productions Ltd, at Opera House, Manchester (28 March – 2 April 1955), Royal Court Theatre, Liverpool (4 – 9 April 1955), King's Theatre, Edinburgh (11 – 16 April 1955), King's Theatre, Glasgow (18 – 23 April 1955), Theatre Royal, Newcastle upon Tyne (25 – 30 April 1955), Theatre Royal, Brighton (2 – 7 May 1955), and Lyric Theatre (Hammersmith), London (11 May – 13 August 1955). The cast included: Dorothy Tutin as Joan, Laurence Naismith as Cauchon, Richard Johnson as Warwick, and Donald Pleasence as the Dauphin. It was directed by Peter Brook.

== Synopsis ==
Essentially a play within a play, Joan reenacts key moments of her life throughout a trial. The play presents the trial, condemnation, and execution of Joan, but has an unusual ending. Remembering the important events in her life throughout her questioning, Joan is subsequently condemned to death. However, Cauchon realizes, just as Joan is burning at the stake, that in her judges' hurry to condemn her, they have not allowed her to re-live the coronation of Charles VII of France. The fire is therefore extinguished, and Joan is given a reprieve. The actual end of the "story" is left in question, but Cauchon proclaims it a victory for Joan.

== Adaptation and style ==
William Becker, in his article "Some French Plays in Translation", writes, "As a practical matter, the art of translation for the theatre is analogous to the art of directing, and involves many similar problems. Both are, in the last analysis, interpretive or critical functions."

Brooks Atkinson, in his New York Times review, described Christopher Frye’s adaptation as; "intellectual attitude" and Lillian Hellman’s, with "solid strength in the theatre." Further: "It is still basically intellectual, the work of a French dramatist who likes to reason his way through a sacred mystery." Invariably, comparison is made to the George Bernard Shaw play, Saint Joan, with Shaw’s work viewed through the lens of a "political philosopher" and Anouilh’s play examined with "detachment" and "intellectual reverie."

John Chapman, writing in the New York Daily News noted that the play "is always the story of a simple girl who became an inspired warrior and then was tried by the church – but there have been several ways of telling it. Anouilh's way, and Miss Hellman's, is to try to tell the story from two viewpoints. One of them is how we look at the tale now as a piece of history, with our knowledge of how the girl's blundering captors unwittingly created a martyr who became forever a symbol of courage and faith. The other viewpoint has been to try to imagine what it must have been like to be Joan herself. Both approaches to this legend of the Martyr of Rouen have been splendidly realized by the technique of divorcing the drama from the confinements of time."

== 1955 Broadway production ==
=== Opening night cast ===
Role	Actor
Warwick	Christopher Plummer
Cauchon	Boris Karloff
Joan	Julie Harris
Her Father	Ward Costello
Mother	Lois Holmes
Brother	John Reese
The Promoter	Roger de Koven
The Inquisitor	Joseph Wiseman
Brother Ladvenu	Michael Higgins
Robert de Beaudricourt	Theodore Bikel
Agnes Sorel	Ann Hillary
The Young Queen	Joan Elan
The Dauphin	Paul Roebling
Queen Yolande	Rita Vale
Archbishop of Rheims	Richard Nicholls
Captain La Hire	Bruce Gordon
Executioner	Ralph Roberts
English Soldier	Ed Knight

== Revivals ==
The York Theatre Company presented the Anouilh/Hellman play in 1989 at the Church of the Heavenly Rest, New York, NY. The production was directed by Janet Hayes Walker with Ann Dowd as Joan.

Cesear’s Forum, Cleveland’s minimalist theatre company, presented the play in a November/December 2004 production at Playhouse Square in the intimate Kennedy’s Theatre. The production blended Christopher Frye and Lillian Hellman’s two adaptations together in a production with Laura Borgione as Joan and a cast of seven.

The Stratford Festival, Ontario, presented the Hellman version of the play in an August/October 2005 production that featured Amanda Plummer in the title role of Joan. Director Michael Lindsay-Hogg set the drama in the latter years of World War II.

The Promethean Theatre Ensemble at the Athenaeum Theatre Studio One (Black Box) in Chicago, presented a production of the Lillian Hellman adaptation in January/February 2014 with Aila Peck as Joan. John Lewis directed.

== Critical reception ==
Cyrus Durgin in the Boston Globe wrote of the Broadway production: "It is done in a free and fluid style, hemmed in by neither the conventional limitations of time sequence nor literal settings. He describes Julie Harris’ performance as a "striking portrayal…a most flexible and compelling projection of a long and difficult role."

Stephen Holden, in his 1989 New York Times review, "Enter the Martyred Maid, But Without 1950s Voices", writes: "When it opened on Broadway in 1955 with Julie Harris as Joan, the play bore obvious analogies to the Communist witch hunts of the era. In its current revival at the York Theater - its first New York production since then - the play doesn't have any convenient metaphorical resonance. Somewhat old-fashioned in tone, the drama is an unabashedly admiring meditation on the phenomenon of Joan." He describes Ann Dowd’s performance as Joan "appealing, muted" with "a low keyed radiance."

Linda Eisenstein writes of the 2004 Cleveland production, "Buried in this talky production are speeches and ideas that ring with a chilling topical resonance." Here, Joan is "haunted." "Unfortunately, most of the performers resort to declaiming their philosophical speeches." Christine Howey in Cleveland Scene writes: "Blending two adaptations of the original script by Christopher Fry and Lillian Hellman, director Greg Cesear attempts to capture a fresh perspective on the intersection of politics and morality…Joan's confounding qualities of insolent confidence and devout humility are portrayed convincingly by chisel-jawed Laura Borgione (even though this actor's adolescent years are disappearing rapidly in the rearview mirror)."

At the Statford Festival in 2005, there was some thrilling to the "star turn" of Amanda Plummer and the historical link with her father Christopher to the play, rather than the age of the "mercurial" 48 year old actress. She had worked previously with Director Lindsay-Hogg on the Broadway production of Agnes of God. As Joan, her performance was "radiating both determination and innocence." However, Christopher Hoile took issue with setting the play in World War II Nazi-occupied Paris. He writes: "Anouilh knew that France had no Joan of Arc to defend its lands in World War II and, worse, had a government that collaborated with the Nazis." Further, "The 1943 setting also means that Joan becomes merely ‘a female resistance fighter’ as the programme calls her which hardly accords with all the special attention she is granted."

The Promethean Theatre 2014 production (the Hellman adaptation) received praise from Tom Williams in Chicago Critic: "In the black box theatre, the play has been skillfully produced on the minimal set." "The lead Aila Peck (Joan) brings an incredible emotion and intensity to the role."

== 1958 Australian TV adaptation ==
The play was adapted for Australian TV in 1958.

== Festival ==
The play was included in the third season of Festival, a Canadian entertainment anthology television series.

== Awards and honors ==
=== Original Broadway production ===
Year	Award ceremony	Category	Nominee	Result
1956	Tony Award	Best Performance by a Leading Actor in a Play	Boris Karloff	Nominated
1956	Tony Award	Best Performance by a Leading Actress in a Play	Julie Harris	Won
1956	Tony Award	Best Director	Joseph Anthony	Nominated
1956	Tony Award	Best Scenic Design	Jo Mielziner	Nominated
1956	Tony Award	Best Costume Design	Alvin Colt	Nominated
