= Hell Bound (1957 film) =

1957 film

- Theatrical release poster
- Directed by: William J. Hole, Jr.
- Screenplay by: Richard H. Landau
- Story by: Richard H. Landau; Arthur E. Orloff
- Produced by: Howard W. Koch
- Starring: John Russell; June Blair; Stuart Whitman; Margo Woode; George E. Mather
- Cinematography: Carl E. Guthrie
- Edited by: John A. Bushelman
- Music by: Les Baxter
- Production company: Bel-Air Productions
- Distributed by: United Artists
- Release date: October 1957
- Running time: 71 minutes
- Country: United States
- Language: English

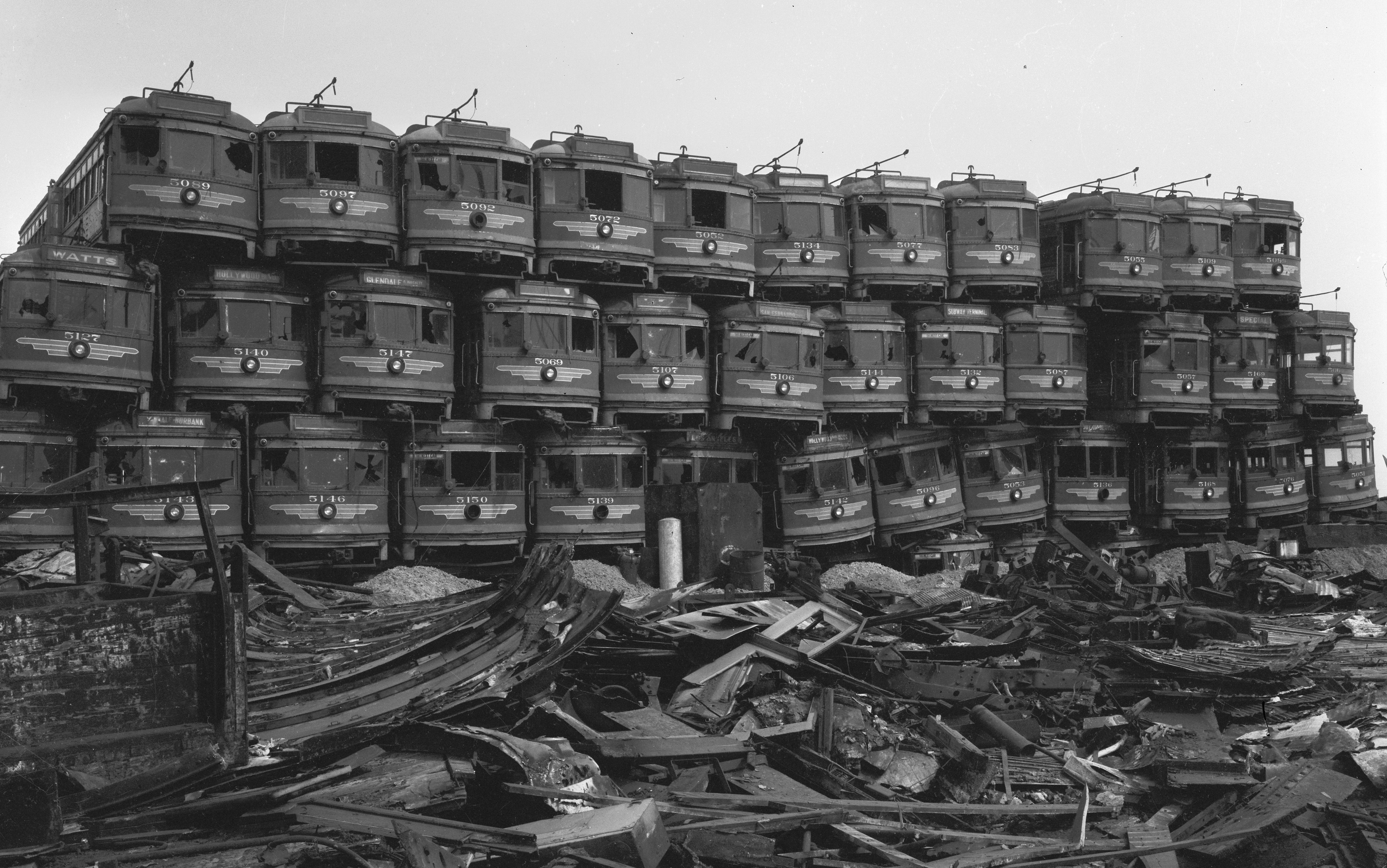
The film's climax was filmed with a backdrop of scrapped streetcars in Los Angeles

Hell Bound is a 1957 American crime film directed by William J. Hole Jr. and written by Richard H. Landau. The film stars John Russell, June Blair, Stuart Whitman, Margo Woode and George E. Mather. The film was released in October 1957, by United Artists.

== Plot ==
A Los Angeles criminal plots the robbery of a ship carrying $2 million worth of surplus narcotics left over from World War II. His plan goes awry when his backer's girlfriend, drafted into a key role in the plan to keep an eye on the bigwig's up-front investment, falls for an ambulance attendant who is an unsuspecting pawn in the scheme.

The climax was filmed at Terminal Island, where hundreds of obsolete "Red Car" inter-urban electric trolleys were stacked awaiting scrapping.

== Cast ==
- John Russell as Jordan
- June Blair as Paula
- Stuart Whitman as Eddie Mason
- Margo Woode as Jan
- George E. Mather as Stanley Thomas
- Stanley Adams as Herbert Fay, Jr.
- Frank Fenton as Harry Quantro
- Dehl Berti as Daddy
