= Jim Aton =

American jazz musician and composer (1925–2008)

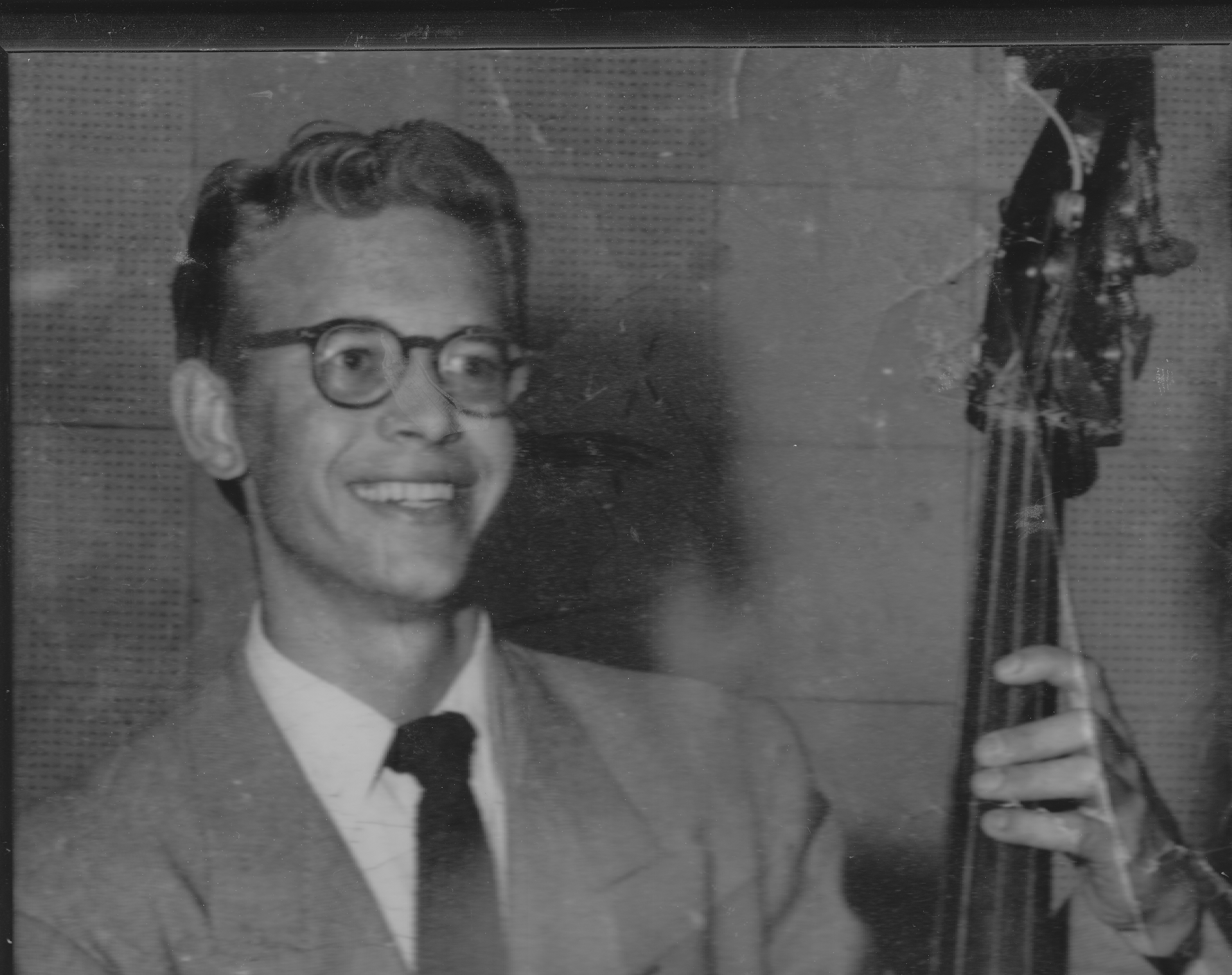

Background information
- Born: James G. Aton; 1925; Sioux City, Iowa, U.S.
- Died: September 16, 2008 (aged 82–83)
- Genres: Jazz
- Occupations: Musician, composer
- Instruments: Double bass, piano, vocals
- Years active: 1940s–2008

James G. Aton (1925 – September 16, 2008), best known as Jim Aton or Jimmy Aton, was an American jazz bassist, pianist, vocalist and composer. He worked with numerous notable artists including Billie Holiday, Anita O'Day and Bill Evans. He appeared in films such as Bop Girl Goes Calypso (1957) with the Bobby Troup Trio, Roustabout (1964) with Elvis Presley and Barbara Stanwyck, and in They Shoot Horses, Don’t They? (1969) with Jane Fonda.

== Early life ==
James Gable Aton was born in Sioux City in 1925. His father owned a music store there, and he studied violin and piano while attending the Sioux City public schools. Following service in the Merchant Marine near the close of World War II, he was drafted and served an additional year in the Air Force, based in Denver and the Philippines. After leaving the military he spent a year studying English and music at the Morningside College Conservatory of music, before transferring to the nearby University of South Dakota. He began performing on string bass in local jazz combos during this period, including a combo led by legendary Kansas City expatriate trumpet player and bandleader Clarence Kenner. Kenner had worked in Kansas City-based big bands in the 1920s and early 1930s and had largely defined the bluesy and swinging style of jazz for which Sioux City later became known. Kenner took the young bassist under his wing, providing Aton with much early valuable professional experience.

== Later life and career ==
Aton moved to Chicago in 1949 to become a full-time professional player. After working small clubs in Milwaukee while awaiting the transfer of his Musicians Union card to the Chicago local, Aton responded to an advertisement in the Variety trade journal to audition with the Chicago-based Herbie Fields Band. Winning the audition, Aton subsequently toured with Fields during the summer of 1950 accompanying jazz legend Billie Holiday on a three-month tour from Chicago to Cleveland, Pittsburgh, New York, Philadelphia, Baltimore, Washington, Richmond and back. Aton won high praise in Downbeat Magazine during the tour and was even compared by a Downbeat reviewer to Jazz bass giant Ray Brown for his talents on the instrument. The Downbeat review immediately solidified Aton's bona fides in the nationwide jazz community and new opportunities quickly surfaced. While not a commercial success, the Fields band of 1950, consisting of a 12-man unit and a six-man combo, nurtured several talented future jazz stars, including pianist Bill Evans, trumpeter Jimmy Nottingham and trombonist Frank Rosolino. Following the Holiday tour, the band returned to Chicago where it recorded a number of "V-Discs" for broadcast over Armed Forces radio.

Aton next substituted briefly as bassist for the Stan Kenton Band followed by more club work in Chicago—often with Bill Evans—backing singer Lurlean Hunter. Aton also worked with Maynard Ferguson and Georgie Auld, while undertaking some additional concentrated formal study on double bass. Aton subsequently was a member of the bass section of the Chicago Civic Orchestra for one year, playing alongside an up-and-coming Richard Davis.

In 1955, Aton moved to Los Angeles on the recommendation of fellow bassist and Sioux Cityan John Mosher. Aton was soon working Hollywood clubs with small combos and then joined the Glenn Miller band, then under the direction of Miller's arranger Jerry Gray, and with whom Aton made his first commercial recording. There followed a steady stream of work in Hollywood clubs with a variety of Jazz stars including Conley Graves, The Page Cavanaugh Trio, Calvin Jackson and Harold Land. He joined Bobby Troup in 1956 and he subsequently appeared with the Bobby Troup Trio and Quintet, as well as with pianist Bill Austin and drummer Stan Levey on episodes of the popular ABC television series The Stars of Jazz. Aton also backed vocalists Betty Roché and Mavis Rivers among others featured on the show throughout 1956–57. Aton became acquainted with saxophonist Buddy Collette at this period and was subsequently offered the job as the original bassist in the piano-less quintet that Collette co-led with drummer Chico Hamilton, joining guitarist Jim Hall and cellist Fred Katz. This unit opened at a beach-front bar in Long Beach with a regular weekly radio air-shot that soon attracted overflow crowds. Aton departed the quintet (replaced by Carson Smith) to become a staff bassist at Gold Star Records, where he joined some of the most talented session players in the business. He recorded un-credited on hundreds of radio and TV commercial jingles as well as sessions backing a string of pop singers and he also doubled on piano on various studio sessions. In 1959, Aton joined pianist-singer Nancy Malcom, guitarist Al Viola and drummer Mel Lewis on the critically acclaimed RCA-Camden LP, The West Coast of Broadway (later reissued on CD). In 1960, Aton recorded on the Monument label with pianist-singer Charles Cochrane on Cochrane's first LP, I Sing, I Play, I'm Charlie Cochrane. Thereafter Aton collaborated with Cochrane composing songs while Aton formally studied music composition (Aton was inducted into The American Society of Composers and Publishers (ASCAP) in 1966).

In 1960, Anita O'Day summoned Aton to Denver to join her on an extended engagement at the Band Box, beginning a professional and personal relationship that would continue off and on for the next nine years. Aton was a prominent—though unnamed—figure in O'Day's 2004 autobiography, High Times, Hard Times. Meanwhile, Aton's composition work was rewarded when pop singer Debbie Reynolds recorded his song, "Love Is A Thing" as a novelty number on one of her LPs.

In 1969, Aton relocated to Reno where he led a six-piece band at Harrah's Casino that at various times included either Pete Candoli or Conte Candoli on trumpet and saxophonist Med Flory. In 1972, Aton settled in Lake Tahoe, where he worked a multi-year casino engagement playing organ in the Earl Hines Quartet, and as a first-call bassist for numerous shows in the Reno-Tahoe area. In later years Aton frequently led small combos—often including trumpeter Fred Padden, bassist Chuck DiLaura and drummer Pete Spomer backing various vocalists. Aton continued to work as a single or with a trio until just three months before his death in September 2008.

== Family ==
Jim was the older brother of Richard "Dick" Aton (1927–2003), also an accomplished jazz pianist who performed over a long career with such West Coast recording artists as saxophonists Harold Land and Zoot Sims and trumpeter Jack Sheldon.
