= William J. Hole Jr. =

American film director (1918–1990)

William J. Hole Jr. (1918–1990) was an American film director of mainly B-movies.

== Life and career ==
He first worked in movies as an extra in the 1938 feature film, Springtime in the Rockies. He then served in World War II, joining the Army.

After the war, he returned to films as a script supervisor on such pictures as My Girl Tessa (1948), the noir thriller Tension (1949), and the 3-D crime film I, the Jury (1953).

In 1957, he directed his first film, Hell Bound, a gritty noir thriller starring John Russell. Made for Howard W. Koch and Edwin F. Zabel of Bel-Air Productions and released by United Artists, it was described by Variety as an "okay programmer" but goes on to say, "the action is especially well staged, and makes fine use of some off-beat backgrounds." The reviewer thought, however, that the film's violence "will not appeal to the squeamish". He made six more films between 1959 and 1964, all low budget affairs, and afterwards was mainly employed in television work. Hole died in 1990 at age 72.

== Filmography ==
=== As director ===
- Hell Bound (1957)
- Speed Crazy (1959)
- Ghost of Dragstrip Hollow (1959)
- Four Fast Guns (1960, also producer)
- Twist All Night (1961)
- The Devil's Hand (1961)
- Face of Terror (1964)

=== As assistant director ===
- The Magnificent Seven Ride! (1972) 2nd AD
- Norman... Is That You? (1976)
