= The Bullfighters =

1945 film by Malcolm St. Clair, Stan Laurel

- Directed by: Mal St. Clair; Stan Laurel
- Written by: W. Scott Darling; Stan Laurel
- Produced by: William Girard
- Starring: Stan Laurel; Oliver Hardy; Margo Woode; Richard Lane; Carol Andrews; Diosa Costello
- Cinematography: Norbert Brodine
- Edited by: Stanley Rabjohn
- Music by: David Buttolph
- Distributed by: 20th Century Fox
- Release date: May 19, 1945
- Running time: 60:55
- Country: United States
- Language: English

The Bullfighters is a feature film starring comedy duo Laurel and Hardy, the sixth and final film the duo made under 20th Century Fox as well as the last released in the United States.

== Plot ==
Private detectives Stan Laurel and Oliver Hardy embark on a journey from their native Peoria, Illinois to Mexico City with the intent of apprehending the notorious criminal Hattie Blake, widely recognized as "Larceny Nell". Meanwhile, American sports promoter Richard K. Muldoon encounters his associate "Hot Shot" Coleman to discuss an upcoming bullfight featuring the esteemed Spanish matador Don Sebastian. However, Muldoon's anger is ignited upon seeing photographs of Don Sebastian, who bears an uncanny resemblance to Laurel. Muldoon's resentment towards Laurel and Hardy stems from a past incident in Peoria, where their testimony led to Muldoon's wrongful conviction and subsequent loss of livelihood and reputation.

As Laurel and Hardy confront Blake in pursuit of justice, she eludes capture and snatches the extradition papers. Their encounter coincides with Muldoon's discovery of Laurel's resemblance to Don Sebastian, prompting Hot Shot to coerce Laurel into impersonating the bullfighter to salvage the impending event. Reluctantly, Laurel complies under the threat of exposure to Muldoon, with the assurance of a handsome reward. Unforeseen circumstances compel Laurel to face the bulls in the ring despite his initial reluctance and inebriation.

However, the real Don Sebastian unexpectedly arrives, leading to a chaotic series of events during the bullfight. Muldoon, recognizing Laurel and incensed by his past injustice, instigates pandemonium in the arena. In a frenzy, Muldoon unleashes every bull, endangering the lives of all present. Laurel and Hardy attempt to flee, only to discover Muldoon hiding in their closet, seeking revenge with a knife. Fulfilling his vow, Muldoon subjects Laurel and Hardy to a symbolic punishment, leaving them with only their heads intact.

In the aftermath, Hardy laments their predicament with his iconic catchphrase, prompting a decision to return to their hometown of Peoria, where they feel they truly belong.

== Cast ==
- Stan Laurel as Stan, Don Sebastian
- Oliver Hardy as Ollie
- Richard Lane as "Hot Shot" Coleman
- Irving Gump as Mr. Gump
- Carol Andrews as Hattie Blake
- Diosa Costello as Conchita
- Ralph Sanford as Richard K. Muldoon
- Margo Woode as Señorita Tangerine
- Rory Calhoun as El Brillante, disgusted matador
- Hank Worden as Mr. McCoy
- Max Wagner as Farmer
- Emmett Vogan as Prosecutor
- Cyril Ring as Cafe Customer
- Jay Novello as Luis, Maître d'hôtel
- Edward Gargan as Vasso, Man Practicing Speech

== Production ==
Laurel wrote and directed portions of the feature which was produced in late 1944 and released in May 1945. The revenge plot was reworked from their short film Going Bye-Bye! (1934), and a tit for tat egg-breaking sequence was reprised from the MGM all-star feature Hollywood Party, in which the team appeared in guest roles, with other gags used that first appeared in The Fixer Uppers (1935) and Way Out West (1937), with other plot aspects reworked from The Kid from Spain (1932), starring Eddie Cantor.

This was Laurel and Hardy's last American film and also the film debut of Frank McCown, who later became famous as Rory Calhoun.

Laurel and Hardy were scheduled to make another film for 20th Century-Fox in the spring of 1945, but the studio discontinued all B-picture production at the end of 1944 and closed the Laurel and Hardy unit. When The Bullfighters became a hit, the studio offered to reopen the entire B department just for Laurel and Hardy, but the comedians declined. Thus, The Bullfighters turned out to be Laurel & Hardy's final American film. (Their final film, Atoll K, was produced in France in 1950–51.)

== Reception ==
Critic Bosley Crowther in the New York Times praised The Bullfighters as “six reels of nonsense” adding that director Malcolm St. Clair, a veteran of the slapstick silent film era, “didn't need a script; he must have had the whole business down pat in the back of his memory.” Crowther admired the climax of the film: “The melee in the bullring (which looks like newsreel footage), with occasional shots of the comedians running around among the crowds and the stampeding bulls, is the best part of the picture.”
