= Bill Johnson (musical theatre actor) =

American actor (1915–1957)

William Johnson
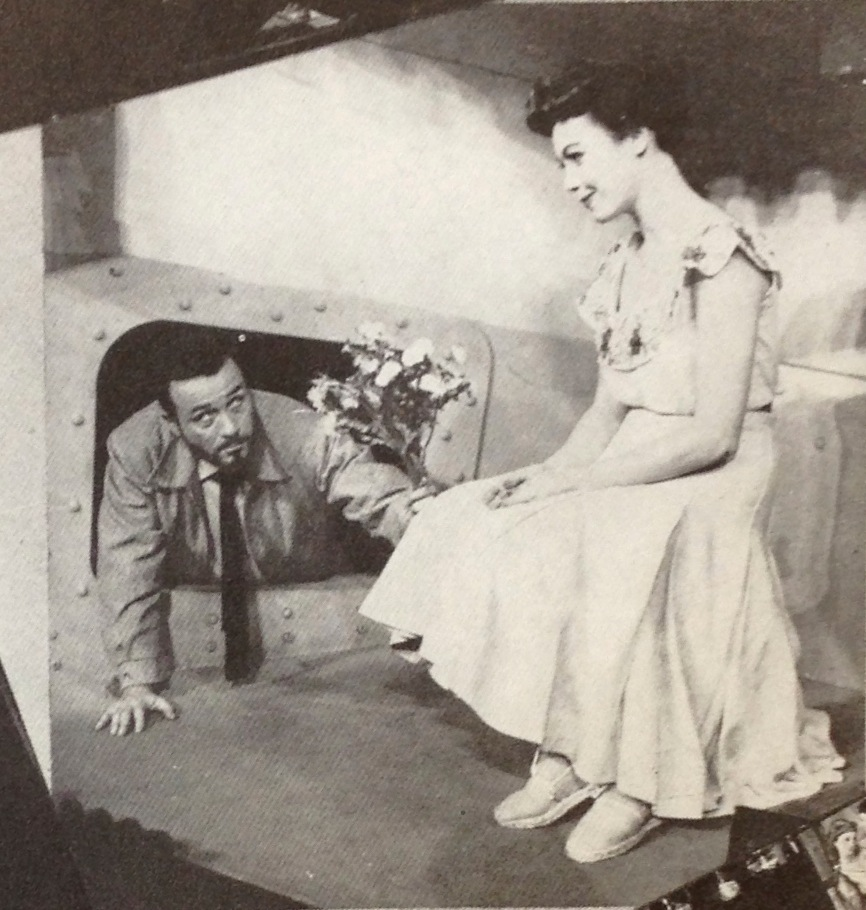
- Bill Johnson and Judy Tyler in the Broadway production of Pipe Dream (1955)
- Born: William Thomas Johnson; March 22, 1915; Baltimore, Maryland, United States
- Died: March 6, 1957 (aged 41); Flemington, New Jersey, U.S.
- Occupations: Actor; singer

William Thomas Johnson (March 22, 1915 – March 6, 1957) was an American actor and singer of the stage and screen.

== Biography ==
Born in Baltimore, Maryland, United States, Johnson began his career as a child actor on the stage. He made his Broadway debut at the age of 8 as Gaffe in the 1924 play Shipwrecked. He returned to Broadway in 1926 to portray the Hangman in Rudolf Friml's The Vagabond King. He worked as a vaudeville performer up through the early 1930s. In 1939 he made his film debut in Mr. & Mrs. Jesse Crawford at Home where he sang the songs "The Very Thought of You" and "I Love You Truly". He only appeared in two more films during his career, the roles of Captain Bill Barclay in Keep Your Powder Dry and Buzz Fletcher in It's a Pleasure, both in 1945.

He studied engineering at the University of Maryland.

In 1940, Johnson returned to Broadway after a fourteen-year absence to star in the musical review All in Fun. He was a regular performer on Broadway during the 1940s and 1950s, appearing in such roles as Charlie in Banjo Eyes, Sherman in Yours, A. Lincoln, Staff Sgt. Rocky Fulton in Something for the Boys, Alex Maitland in The Day Before Spring, and Hajj in Kismet, among others. During this time, in 1945, he became a member of The Lambs.

He starred opposite Ethel Merman in 1944, in Something for the Boys. He also starred (as Fred Petruchio) alongside Patricia Morison in the first UK production of Cole Porter's Kiss Me, Kate, at the London Coliseum in 1951, and on the cast recording of that show. He also appeared in Annie Get Your Gun. His last role on Broadway was in 1955–1956 as Doc in Pipe Dream for which he garnered a Tony Award nomination.

He appeared as a castaway on the BBC Radio programme Desert Island Discs on 27 June 1951. The programme asks guests to select eight records to have with them on a hypothetical desert island. Johnson's section included one of his own recordings, of "Where is the life that late I led?", from Kiss Me, Kate, in which he was appearing at the time.

Johnson died in Flemington, New Jersey, United States from a heart attack on March 6, 1957, just sixteen days before his 41st birthday. He was survived by his wife, Jet MacDonald, and 3-month-old daughter, Julie.
