= The Ponder Heart =

1953 novella by Eudora Welty

- 1954 Harcourt Brace edition
- Author: Eudora Welty
- Illustrator: Joe Krush
- Language: English
- Genre: Tragicomedy, murder mystery
- Publisher: The New Yorker; Harcourt Brace
- Publication date: December 5, 1953; 1954
- Publication place: United States
- Pages: 168
- ISBN: 978-0-15-173073-5
- OCLC: 632720406

The Ponder Heart is a novella written by Eudora Welty and illustrated by Joe Krush, originally published in The New Yorker in 1953, and republished by Harcourt Brace in 1954. The plot of The Ponder Heart follows Daniel Ponder, a wealthy heir, and is told through the narration of Edna Earle Ponder, Daniel's niece. In 1956, the story was made into a Broadway play by Joseph Fields and Jerome Chodorov. Una Merkel won the Tony Award for Best Featured Actress in a Play for her portrayal of Edna Earle Ponder in the Broadway play.

== Plot ==
The novella is set in fictional rural Clay County, Mississippi, home to the Ponders, the richest family in the county. Daniel Ponder, a "mildly retarded man" according to literary scholars, is the heir to his father Sam Ponder's wealth.

The story is narrated through the perspective of Edna Earle. As Daniel generously gives away his possessions, including a gas station and heirloom watches, his father and his niece, Edna Earle Ponder, try to save their family fortune by having Daniel institutionalized to a psychiatric hospital. When Sam instead of Daniel is institutionalized by accident, the two try to have Daniel marry Teacake Magee, an eligible widow. The marriage only lasts two months.

When Daniel proposes to wed 17-year-old Bonnie Dee Peacock, of a very poor and unrespected family who comes to the town of Clay to seek work, elderly Sam Ponder dies of a heart attack. After five years of marriage, Bonnie runs away. Edna Earle suspects the young woman felt awkward, and perhaps trapped, within the rural mansion and with its Black servants. The young wife seems to be the only possession Daniel wants to keep.

Bonnie Dee returns to Daniel's house. She soon puts out her husband but eventually summons him after dinner (lunch) one day. A storm is brewing as Edna Earle drives her uncle to the house, where they find Bonnie Dee dead under mysterious circumstances.

After the funeral, the Peacock family, under the advice of district attorney Dorris Gladney, indict Daniel on murder charges. A parade of witnesses - white and black - are called to testify. Contrary to his own legal counsel DeYancey Clanahan, Uncle Daniel convinces the judge and jury of his innocence. Without Bonnie Dee, the man returns to eagerly giving away his riches -- in cash and coin -- to all present at the trial, including the Peacocks.

People of all ages in the courtroom don't leave empty-handed. The money now separates the townspeople, who used to gather at the Beulah Hotel which Edna Earle operates.

== Adaptations ==
A play was adapted from The Ponder Heart, which ran on Broadway from February 16, 1956, to June 23, 1956. Portraying Edna Earle Ponder, Una Merkel won the Tony Award for Best Featured Actress in a Play for her performance, while Ben Edwards was nominated for a Tony Award for scenic design. The Public Broadcasting Service also adapted the novella to a television film directed by Martha Coolidge as a part of the Masterpiece series in October 2001. The Ponder Heart was also adapted as an opera by Alice Parker, which premiered in Jackson, Mississippi in 1982.

== Reception ==
The story received generally positive review from critics; Welty scholar Pearl Amelia McHaney called The Ponder Heart the "most positively received of Welty's books". Charles Poore of the New York Times called the novel "a wonderful tragicomedy of good intentions in a durably sinful world".
