= Alvin Colt =

American costume designer

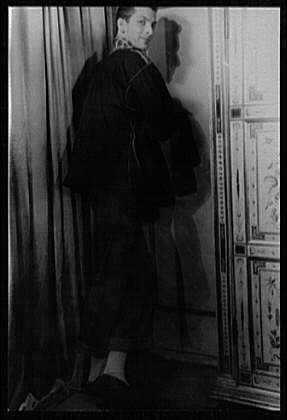
Alvin Colt (1952) Photo by Carl Van Vechten

Alvin Colt (July 5, 1916 – May 4, 2008) was an American costume designer. Colt worked on over 50 Broadway shows.

His first job was in a theatrical fabric house, he also worked on painting scenery during the summer. On the Town was the first Broadway show he worked on in 1944. His major Broadway credits include Guys and Dolls, Top Banana, Fanny, Finian's Rainbow, Six Characters in Search of an Author, Destry Rides Again, Wildcat, Here's Love, The Crucible, The Goodbye People, Sugar, Lorelei, Jerome Robbins' Broadway and Waiting in the Wings for producer Alexander H. Cohen, with whom he had a long working relationship. Alvin won a Tony Award in 1955 for Pipe Dream. He did the costumes for the 1957 show, Rumple. The last official show he worked on was in 2001 for If you ever leave me...I'm going with you!

Colt also designed for TV and film. Among his screen credits are costume designs for the films Top Banana, Stiletto and Li'l Abner and for the TV productions of The Enchanted Nutcracker, Kiss Me Kate, The Adams Chronicles, CBS: On the Air, Happy 100th Birthday, Hollywood and many years of the Tony Awards. Alvin also designed the children's musical Treehouse Trolls Birthday Day for Goodtimes Entertainment.

He was inducted into the American Theatre Hall of Fame in 2002.

In 2007 the Museum of the City of New York offered the exhibition "Costumes and Characters: The Designs of Alvin Colt," and the museum is now the home of many of his costume sketches.

Colt died of natural causes on May 4, 2008, in New York City.

== Awards and nominations ==
Year	Award	Category	Work	Result
1956	Tony Award	Best Costume Design	Pipe Dream	Won
1956	Tony Award	Best Costume Design	The Lark	Nominated
1956	Tony Award	Best Costume Design	Phoenix '55	Nominated
1957	Tony Award	Best Costume Design	Li'l Abner	Nominated
1957	Tony Award	Best Costume Design	The Sleeping Prince	Nominated
1960	Tony Award	Best Costume Design	Greenwillow	Nominated
1976	Primetime Emmy Award	Outstanding Achievement in Costume Design for a Drama or Comedy Series	The Adams Chronicles	Nominated
1977	Primetime Emmy Award	Outstanding Achievement in Costume Design for a Drama or Comedy Series	The Adams Chronicles	Nominated
1986	Primetime Emmy Award	Outstanding Costume Design for a Variety or Music Program	NBC 60th Anniversary Celebration	Nominated
1987	Primetime Emmy Award	Outstanding Costume Design for a Variety or Music Program	Happy 100th Birthday, Hollywood	Nominated
1999	Drama Desk Award	Outstanding Costume Design	Forbidden Broadway Cleans Up Its Act	Nominated
