= The Honeys (play) =

Play by Roald Dahl

The Honeys is a play written by Roald Dahl. It toured Boston, Philadelphia and New Haven before opening on Broadway on 28 April 1955. It starred Hume Cronyn, Jessica Tandy, and Dorothy Stickney. Although it received some good notices, it ran for only 36 performances. Its short run, combined with the difficulties that Dahl had with the play's director, convinced Dahl to stick to short–story writing. The play is based on some of the stories from Someone Like You and revolves around two sisters who decide to murder their husbands. As of 2020, the text of the play has not been published.
