= Salvatore Dell'Isola =

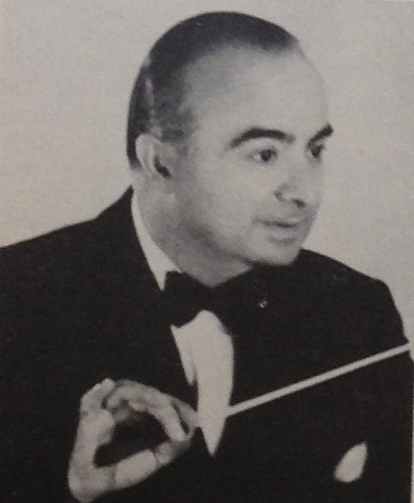
Salvatore Dell'Isola

Salvatore Dell'Isola (January 4, 1901 – March 13, 1989) was a conductor who acted as music director for several of the Rodgers and Hammerstein musicals on Broadway, among others. He won a Tony Award as music director of Flower Drum Song.

== Life and career ==
Dell'Isola was born in Province of Salerno, Italy, and moved to New York with his family in 1907 but returned to Salerno to study the violin at the conservatory there, playing in opera orchestras all over the country by age 12. He continued to play the violin in the U.S. in opera, vaudeville, movies and other entertainments. He also scored foreign films and radio programs for RKO.

He began his professional conducting career on the radio and in vaudeville shows. In the 1920s, he was engaged as the conductor of the RKO orchestra and played the violin in the Metropolitan Opera Orchestra for ten years. In 1944, Dell'Isola conducted the Naumburg Orchestral Concerts at the Naumburg Bandshell in their Central Park summer series.

Dell'Isola was hired by Rodgers and Hammerstein to conduct a touring production of Oklahoma! in the mid-1940s. He first music directed on Broadway for Rodgers and Hammerstein's Allegro in 1947. His other Broadway musicals were South Pacific (1949); Me and Juliet (1953); On Your Toes (1954 revival); Ankles Aweigh (1955); Pipe Dream (1955), for which he was nominated for a Tony Award for Best Conductor and Musical Director; and Flower Drum Song (1958), for which he won the Tony Award for Best Conductor and Musical Director. He also conducted for national tours of some of these shows and a European tour of Oklahoma!.

He also served as musical director for many productions at the Westbury Music Fair Dell'Isola conducted the annual large-scale New York Philharmonic Orchestra Rodgers and Hammerstein concerts for 16 years. He also conducted on the 1950s TV program Opera Cameos and, over the course of his career, conducted opera performances, musicals, symphonies and chamber ensembles in the New York area. His work can be heard on numerous recordings. In 1987, he won a belated Grammy Award for the South Pacific cast album. He had a son, Alfonso.

Dell'Isola continued to conduct through the 1980s and died of heart failure in West Islip, New York, at the age of 88.
