= Eisenstein (Ore Mountains) =

Mountain in Germany

Coordinates: 50°35′N 12°44′E

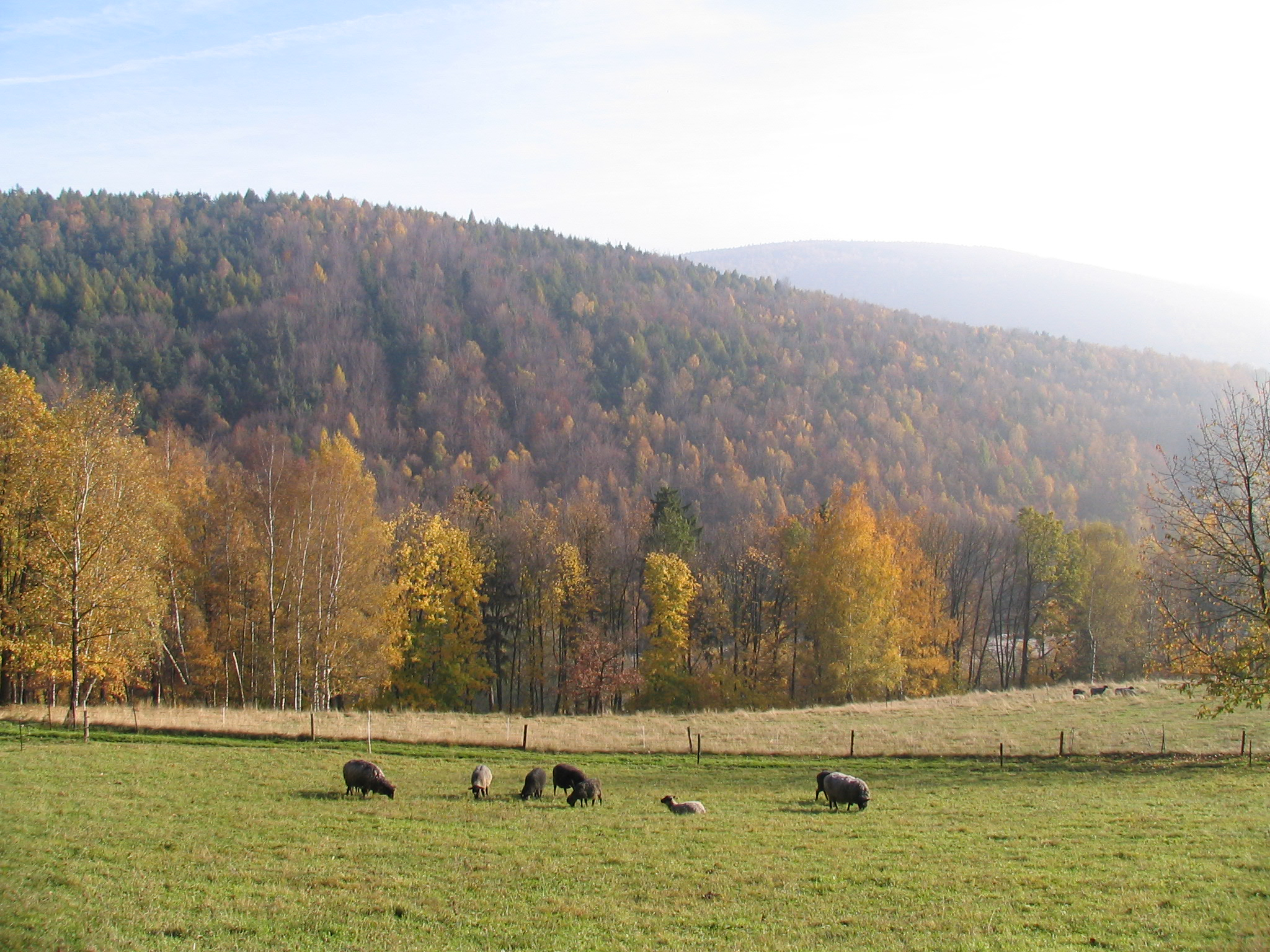

Highest point
- Elevation: 516.2 m (1,694 ft)

Geography
- Location: Saxony, Germany

Eisenstein is a mountain of Saxony, southeastern Germany.
