= Linda Eisenstein =

American playwright and composer

Linda Eisenstein is an American playwright and composer.

== Career ==
Linda Eisenstein is an author, composer, journalist and activist for the rights of women playwrights. Born in Chicago, raised in San Francisco and living now in Cleveland, Ohio, she is an active member of the International Centre for Women Playwrights, the Dramatists Guild and the American Society of Composers, Authors and Publishers (ASCAP). Since 1995, she has been a member of the Cleveland Play House Playwrights' Unit.

Eisenstein's award-winning plays and musicals have been produced throughout United States and Canada, England, Australia, and South Africa. She is the recipient of many awards, among them, three Ohio Arts Council Individual Artist Fellowships in Playwriting (1991, 1995, 2003). She holds a B.A., cum laude, from Cleveland State University (1971) and a M.A., summa cum laude, from the same university in Creative Writing (1994). She has also a rich experience in teaching playwriting, creative writing, and musical theatre. Her plays have been published by Dramatic Publishing Company and are available also in anthologies by Penguin, Vintage, Heinemann, Meriwether, and Smith & Kraus. Her poetry and fiction have appeared in several journals.

Also a theatre journalist and reviewer, Eisenstein is the chief theatre correspondent for angle: a journal of arts + culture and Cool Cleveland, and since 1992 has been a frequent contributor to the Cleveland Plain Dealer.

== Works ==
=== Musicals ===
- The Last Red Wagon Tent Show in the Land (1986) - Music by Linda Eisenstein, Lyrics by Teddi Davis, Book by Eisenstein & Davis
- A Soldier's Passion or Dancing (1987) - Music by Linda Eisenstein, based on poems by Siegfried Sassoon
- Star Wares: The Next Generation (1989) - Music by Linda Eisenstein, Book & Lyrics by James Levin and Linda Eisenstein
- Street Sense (1991) - Music by Linda Eisenstein, Libretto by Migdalia Cruz
- The Chapel of Perpetual Desire Presents a Liturgical Circus of Religious Fervour and Live Sex on Stage (1992) - Music & Lyrics by Linda Eisenstein, Book by Linda Eisenstein, Amanda Shaffer, and James Levin
- Discordia (2003) - Music by Linda Eisenstein, Book/Lyrics by James Levin and Linda Eisenstein
- Becoming George (2004) - Music by Linda Eisenstein, Book/Lyrics by Patti McKenny and Doug Frew
- Holiday Hotline (2005) - Music by Linda Eisenstein, Book by Michael Sepesy, Lyrics by Linda Eisenstein, Teddi Davis, and Michael Sepesy

=== Full-length plays ===
- Three the Hard Way (1995)
- Rehearsing Cyrano (2000)
- Eisenstein's Monster (2004)

=== Play collections ===
- Bad Grrrls: 11 short monologue plays for women (1997)
- Running from the Red Girl: And other short plays (1998)
- Intimate Relations (2000)

=== One act plays ===
- The Names of the Beast (1996)
- Marla's Devotion (1997)
- Pig Patter
- Revelation 24:12
- Running from the Red Girl (1996)
- That Was No Lady from the Sea
- Gentrification (1996)
- A Rustle of Wings
- Higher
- Heart Smart
- Optional, or How to Be Naked in Northern California
- Golden Gate
- Justice of the Peace
- Endorphins
- Training Horses (2001)
- Post-Structuralists and the Temple of Artifacts (1994)

=== Monologue plays ===
- At the Root (1994)
- Acme Temporary Services
- Balancing Act
- The Cassandra Complex
- The Club
- A Cock. A Dream. A True Story.
- Devils
- F2F
- In Illo Tempore (1994)
- Mrs. Jones Celebrates Valentine's Day
- Pretzels & Longing
- Style
- Ungrateful
- Welcome to the Vestibule
- Zombie Grrlz from the Crypt
