= Judy Tyler =

American singer-actress (1932–1957)

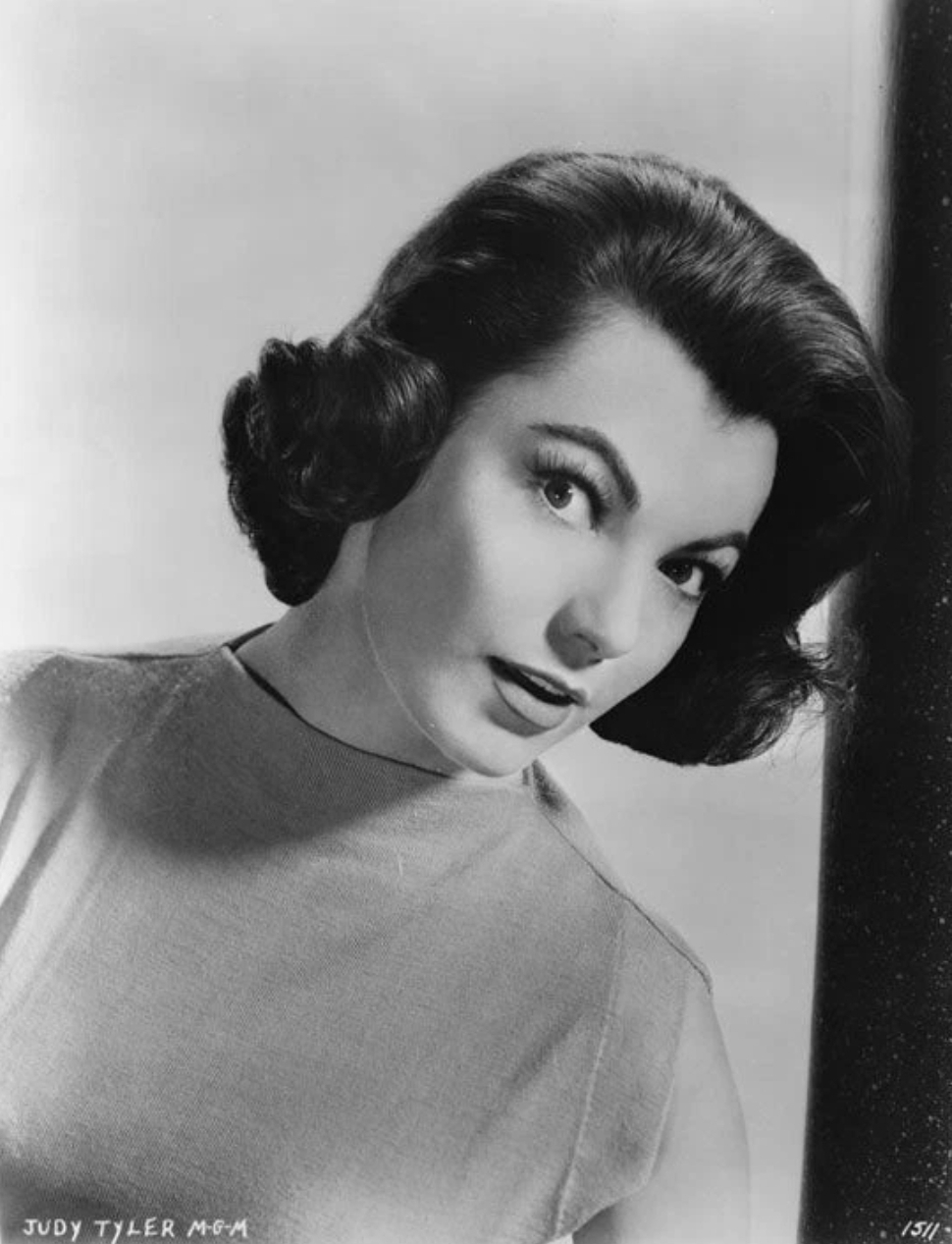
- Tyler in 1957
- Born: Judith Mae Hess; October 9, 1932; Milwaukee, Wisconsin U.S.
- Died: July 3, 1957 (aged 24) near Rock River, Wyoming, U.S.
- Occupation: Actress
- Years active: 1947–1957
- Spouses: Colin Romoff (m. 1950; div. 1956) Gregory Lafayette (m. 1957)

Judy Tyler (born Judith Mae Hess; October 9, 1932 – July 3, 1957) was an American singer and actress.

== Early life and career ==
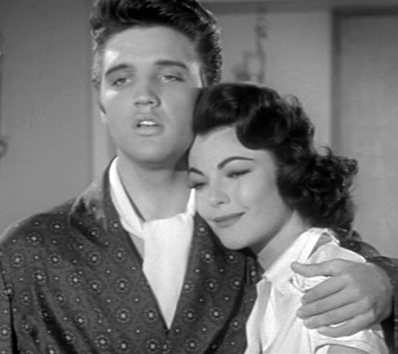
Tyler alongside Elvis Presley

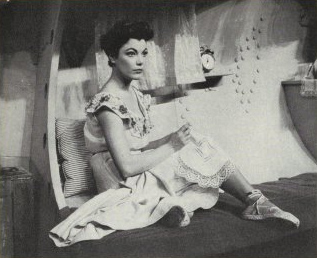
Tyler in the Broadway production of Pipe Dream (1955)

Judy Tyler spent her teen years in Teaneck, New Jersey. She came from a show business family and was encouraged to study dance and acting. Tyler's acting career began as a teenager, with regular appearances on Howdy Doody as Princess Summerfall Winterspring from 1950 to 1953.

Like her mother, Tyler became a chorus girl, and then landed a starring role in the Rodgers and Hammerstein musical Pipe Dream. Life did a story on rising Broadway talent with Tyler on its cover as one of the up-and-coming stars. Tyler lived with her parents in Teaneck while appearing on Howdy Doody and Broadway.

Offered an opportunity in Hollywood, Tyler appeared in the film Bop Girl Goes Calypso (1957), then starred opposite Elvis Presley in Jailhouse Rock (1957). On December 28, 1957, nearly six months after she died, Tyler was a cast member in a televised Perry Mason episode, "The Case of the Fan Dancer's Horse," the last screen role she filmed.

== Death ==
A few days after her Jailhouse Rock filming ended, Tyler and her second husband, Gregory Lafayette (born Earl Gregory Nisonger Jr.), began driving home to New York from Hollywood. While driving through Wyoming on July 3, 1957, they were involved in an automobile accident on U.S. Route 287 near Rock River. Tyler was killed instantly, aged 24, and Lafayette died the next day, aged 19. The Casper Morning Star reported the passenger killed in the oncoming car, driven by Paul Reed, was Don D. Jones, 23, of Hanna, Wyoming. Police said Lafayette's car swerved to avoid hitting a slow-moving car-and-trailer entering the highway and collided head-on with the other vehicle in the crash.

== Filmography ==
=== Films ===
Year	Title	Role	Notes
1957	Bop Girl Goes Calypso	Jo Thomas	
1957	Jailhouse Rock	Peggy Van Alden	

=== Television ===
Year(s)	Title	Role	Notes
1950–1953	Howdy Doody	Princess Summerfall Winterspring	96 Episodes
1957	Perry Mason	Irene Kilby	Episode: "The Case of the Fan Dancer's Horse"; aired posthumously
