= 17th Tony Awards =

1963 US theatrical awards ceremony

- Date: April 28, 1963
- Location: Hotel Americana; New York City
- Hosted by: Abe Burrows; Robert Morse
- Most wins: A Funny Thing Happened on the Way to the Forum (6)
- Most nominations: Little Me and Oliver! (10)
- Website: http://www.tonyawards.com/

Television/radio coverage
- Network: WWOR-TV

The 17th Annual Tony Awards took place on April 28, 1963, in the Hotel Americana Imperial Ballroom in New York City. The ceremony was broadcast on local television station WWOR-TV (Channel 9) in New York City. The awards were given to plays and musicals from the 1962/63 season that had their premiere on Broadway. The Masters of Ceremonies were Abe Burrows and Robert Morse.

== Eligibility ==
Shows that opened on Broadway during the 1962–1963 season before March 30, 1963 are eligible.

Original plays

- The Affair
- Andorra
- The Beauty Part
- Beyond the Fringe
- Calculated Risk
- Come on Strong
- Dear Me, The Sky is Falling
- Enter Laughing
- The Fun Couple
- Harold
- The Heroine
- Hidden Stranger
- In the Counting House
- The Lady of the Camellias
- Lord Pengo
- Lorenzo
- The Milk Train Doesn't Stop Here Anymore
- Moby Dick
- The Moon Besieged
- Mother Courage and Her Children
- My Mother, My Father and Me
- Natural Affection
- Never Too Late
- Night Life
- On an Open Roof
- The Perfect Setup
- Photo Finish
- The Riot Act
- Seidman and Son
- Step on a Crack
- Tchin-Tchin
- A Thousand Clowns
- Tiger, Tiger Burning Bright
- Venus at Large
- Who's Afraid of Virginia Woolf?

Original musicals

- Bravo Giovanni
- A Funny Thing Happened on the Way to the Forum
- The Hollow Crown
- Little Me
- Mr. President
- Nowhere to Go But Up
- Oliver!
- Stop the World - I Want to Get Off
- Tovarich

Play revivals

- The Father
- Long Day's Journey into Night
- Miss Julie
- The School for Scandal
- Strange Interlude
- Too True to Be Good

Musical revivals

- Brigadoon

== The ceremony ==
Presenters: Elizabeth Ashley, Jean-Pierre Aumont, Orson Bean, Vivian Blaine, Diahann Carroll, Dane Clark, Betty Field, Martin Gabel, Anita Gillette, June Havoc, Helen Hayes, Van Heflin, Pat Hingle, Celeste Holm, Nancy Kelly, Sam Levene, Walter Matthau, Helen Menken, Phyllis Newman, Maureen O'Sullivan, Charles Nelson Reilly, William Prince, Rosalind Russell, David Wayne. Music was by Meyer Davis and his Orchestra.

== Winners and nominees ==
Winners are in bold

Sources: InfoPlease, BroadwayWorld

Best Play	Best Musical
**Who's Afraid of Virginia Woolf? – Edward Albee**; A Thousand Clowns – Herb Gardner; Mother Courage and Her Children – Bertolt Brecht; Tchin-Tchin – Sidney Michaels	**A Funny Thing Happened on the Way to the Forum**; Little Me; Oliver!; Stop the World – I Want to Get Off
Best Producer (Dramatic)	Best Producer (Musical)
**Richard Barr and Clinton Wilder – Who's Afraid of Virginia Woolf?**; The Actors Studio Theatre – Strange Interlude; Cheryl Crawford and Jerome Robbins – Mother Courage and Her Children; Paul Vroom, Buff Cobb and Burry Fredrik – Too True to Be Good	**Harold Prince – A Funny Thing Happened on the Way to the Forum**; Cy Feuer and Ernest Martin – Little Me; David Merrick and Donald Albery – Oliver!
Best Author (Musical)	Best Original Score (Music and/or Lyrics) Written for the Theatre
**Burt Shevelove and Larry Gelbart – A Funny Thing Happened on the Way to the Forum**; Lionel Bart – Oliver!; Leslie Bricusse and Anthony Newley – Stop the World – I Want to Get Off; Neil Simon – Little Me	**Oliver! – Lionel Bart (music and lyrics)**; Stop the World – I Want to Get Off – Anthony Newley (music) and Leslie Bricusse (lyrics); Little Me – Cy Coleman (music) and Carolyn Leigh (lyrics); Bravo Giovanni – Milton Schafer (music) and Ronny Graham (lyrics)
Best Performance by a Leading Actor in a Play	Best Performance by a Leading Actress in a Play
**Arthur Hill – Who's Afraid of Virginia Woolf? as George**; Charles Boyer – Lord Pengo as Lord Pengo; Paul Ford – Never Too Late as Harry Lambert; Bert Lahr – The Beauty Part as Various Characters	**Uta Hagen – Who's Afraid of Virginia Woolf? as Martha**; Hermione Baddeley – The Milk Train Doesn't Stop Here Anymore as Flora Goforth; Margaret Leighton – Tchin-Tchin as Pamela Pew-Pickett; Claudia McNeil – Tiger, Tiger Burning Bright as Mama Morris
Best Performance by a Leading Actor in a Musical	Best Performance by a Leading Actress in a Musical
**Zero Mostel – A Funny Thing Happened on the Way to the Forum as Pseudolus**; Sid Caesar – Little Me as Various Characters; Anthony Newley – Stop the World – I Want to Get Off as Littlechap; Clive Revill – Oliver! as Fagin	**Vivien Leigh – Tovarich as Tatiana**; Georgia Brown – Oliver! as Nancy; Nanette Fabray – Mr. President as Nell Henderson; Sally Ann Howes – Brigadoon as Fiona MacLaren
Best Performance by a Supporting or Featured Actor in a Play	Best Performance by a Supporting or Featured Actress in a Play
**Alan Arkin – Enter Laughing as David Kolowitz**; Barry Gordon – A Thousand Clowns as Nick Burns; Paul Rogers – Photo Finish as Reginald Kinsale, Esq.; Frank Silvera – The Lady of the Camellias as M. Duval	**Sandy Dennis – A Thousand Clowns as Sandra Markowitz**; Melinda Dillon – Who's Afraid of Virginia Woolf? as Honey; Alice Ghostley – The Beauty Part as Various Characters; Zohra Lampert – Mother Courage and Her Children as Kattrin
Best Performance by a Supporting or Featured Actor in a Musical	Best Performance by a Supporting or Featured Actress in a Musical
**David Burns – A Funny Thing Happened on the Way to the Forum as Senex**; Jack Gilford – A Funny Thing Happened on the Way to the Forum as Hysterium; David Jones – Oliver! as The Artful Dodger; Swen Swenson – Little Me as George Musgrove	**Anna Quayle – Stop the World – I Want to Get Off as Various Characters**; Ruth Kobart – A Funny Thing Happened on the Way to the Forum as Domina; Virginia Martin – Little Me as Young Belle Poitrine; Louise Troy – Tovarich as Natalia Mayovskaya
Best Direction of a Play	Best Direction of a Musical
**Alan Schneider – Who's Afraid of Virginia Woolf?**; George Abbott – Never Too Late; John Gielgud – The School for Scandal; Peter Glenville – Tchin-Tchin	**George Abbott – A Funny Thing Happened on the Way to the Forum**; Peter Coe – Oliver!; John Fearnley – Brigadoon; Cy Feuer and Bob Fosse – Little Me
Best Choreography	Best Conductor and Musical Director
**Bob Fosse – Little Me**; Carol Haney – Bravo Giovanni	**Donald Pippin – Oliver!**; Jay Blackton – Mr. President; Anton Coppola – Bravo Giovanni; Julius Rudel – Brigadoon
Best Stage Technician	Best Scenic Design
**Solly Pernick – Mr. President**; Milton Smith – Beyond the Fringe	**Sean Kenny – Oliver!**; Will Steven Armstrong – Tchin-Tchin; Anthony Powell – The School for Scandal; Franco Zeffirelli – The Lady of the Camellias
Best Costume Design
**Anthony Powell – The School for Scandal**; Marcel Escoffier – The Lady of the Camellias; Robert Fletcher – Little Me; Motley – Mother Courage and Her Children

== Special award ==
- Bette Davis, honored for her work with the National Repertory Theatre.

=== Multiple nominations and awards ===
These productions had multiple nominations:

- 10 nominations: Little Me and Oliver!
- 8 nominations: A Funny Thing Happened on the Way to the Forum
- 6 nominations: Who's Afraid of Virginia Woolf?
- 5 nominations: Stop the World – I Want to Get Off
- 4 nominations: Mother Courage and Her Children and Tchin-Tchin
- 3 nominations: Bravo Giovanni, Brigadoon, The Lady of the Camellias, The School for Scandal and A Thousand Clowns
- 2 nominations: The Beauty Part, Beyond the Fringe, Mr. President, Never Too Late and Tovarich

The following productions received multiple awards.

- 6 wins: A Funny Thing Happened on the Way to the Forum
- 5 wins: Who's Afraid of Virginia Woolf?
- 3 wins: Oliver!

== See also ==
- 35th Academy Awards
