= Joseph Lynn (disambiguation) =

Joseph Lynn (1856–1927) was an English first-class cricketer.

Joseph or Joe Lynn may also refer to:

- Joe Lynn (property master), American theatrical Property master
- Joe Lynn (1925–1992), English footballer
