= Pernick =

Pernick is a surname of Jewish origin, derived from the Belarusian word pernik meaning gingerbread. Notable people with the surname include:

- Ron Pernick (fl. 2001–2012), American author
- Solly Pernick (1898–1990), American stage technician
