= 6th Tony Awards =

1952 US theatrical awards ceremony

- Date: March 30, 1952
- Location: Waldorf-Astoria Hotel; New York City, New York
- Hosted by: Dean Martin
- Most wins: The King and I (5)

Television/radio coverage
- Network: WOR, Mutual Network

The 6th Annual Tony Awards, presented by the American Theatre Wing, took place at the Waldorf-Astoria Grand Ballroom, on March 30, 1952. It was broadcast on radio station WOR and the Mutual Network. The Antoinette Perry Awards for Excellence in Theatre, more commonly known as the Tony Awards, recognize achievement in Broadway theatre.

== Ceremony ==
The presenter was Helen Hayes.

Performers were Odette Myrtil with her son Roger Adams; and Victor Borge.

Music was by Meyer Davis and his Orchestra.

== Award winners ==
Source: InfoPlease

=== Production ===
Award	Winner
Outstanding Play	The Fourposter, by Jan de Hartog (playwright), The Playwrights Company (producer)
Outstanding Musical	The King and I, Oscar Hammerstein II (book and lyrics), Richard Rodgers (music), Oscar Hammerstein II and Richard Rodgers (producers)

=== Performance ===
Award	Winner
Best Actor-Play	Jose Ferrer, The Shrike
Best Actress-Play	Julie Harris, I Am a Camera
Best Actor-Musical	Phil Silvers, Top Banana
Best Actress-Musical	Gertrude Lawrence, The King and I
Distinguished Supporting or Featured Dramatic Actor	John Cromwell, Point of No Return
Distinguished Supporting or Featured Dramatic Actress	Marian Winters, I Am a Camera
Distinguished Supporting or Featured Musical Actor	Yul Brynner, The King and I
Distinguished Supporting or Featured Musical Actress	Helen Gallagher, Pal Joey

=== Craft ===
Award	Winner
Outstanding Director	José Ferrer for The Shrike, The Fourposter
Scenic Designer	Jo Mielziner for The King and I
Costume Designer	Irene Sharaff for The King and I
Outstanding Choreographer	Robert Alton for Pal Joey
Conductor and Musical Director	Max Meth for Pal Joey
Stage Technician	Peter Feller (master carpenter) for Call Me Madam

== Special awards ==
- Edward Kook, for his contributing to and encouraging the development of stage lighting and electronics
- Judy Garland, for an important contribution to the revival of vaudeville through her recent stint at the Palace Theatre
- Charles Boyer, for distinguished performance in Don Juan in Hell, thereby assisting in a new theatre trend

=== Multiple nominations and awards ===
The following productions received multiple awards.

- 5 wins: The King and I
- 3 wins: Pal Joey
- 2 wins: The Fourposter, I Am a Camera and The Shrike

== See also ==
- 24th Academy Awards
