= The Dave Garroway Show (TV program) =

American TV variety series (1953–1954)

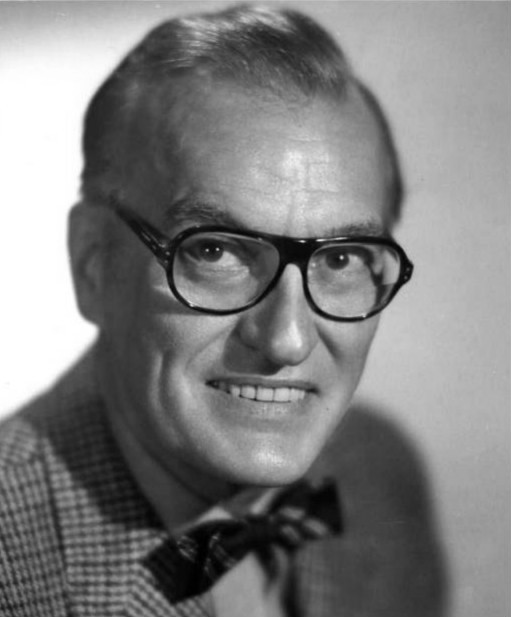
- Dave Garroway
- Genre: Variety
- Country of origin: United States
- Original language: English
- No. of seasons: 1

Original release
- Network: NBC
- Release: October 2, 1953 – June 25, 1954

The Dave Garroway Show is an American television variety program that was broadcast on NBC from October 2, 1953, to June 25, 1954.

== Overview ==
Vincent Terrace's Encyclopedia of Television Shows, 1925 through 2010 described the show as "A casual program of music, songs, and chatter." The 30-minute program was broadcast on Friday nights at 8 p.m. Eastern Time.

As the title indicated, Dave Garroway was the host. For the nine months that the program aired on Friday evenings, he was also host of the Today morning program. Other regulars on the program were Jack Haskell, Jill Corey, Cliff Norton, and Shirley Harmer, along with dancers Ken Spaulding and Diane Sinclair. Skitch Henderson directed the music.

Guest performers included Patrice Munsel and Ethel Waters.

== Production ==
Charlie Andrews produced and wrote the program; Mike Zeamer was the initial director. He resigned in October 1953, citing a personity conflict with choreographer Edith Barstow. Bob Banner succeeded him. Pontiac Motors sponsored it. It was replaced by The Marriage.

== Critical response ==
A review in the trade publication Billboard called the show "a pleasant, unexciting variety program". It said that the format was similar to that of Garroway at Large, but that this program suffered in comparison to its predecessor.
