= The Dave Garroway Show (radio program) =

American old-time radio variety program

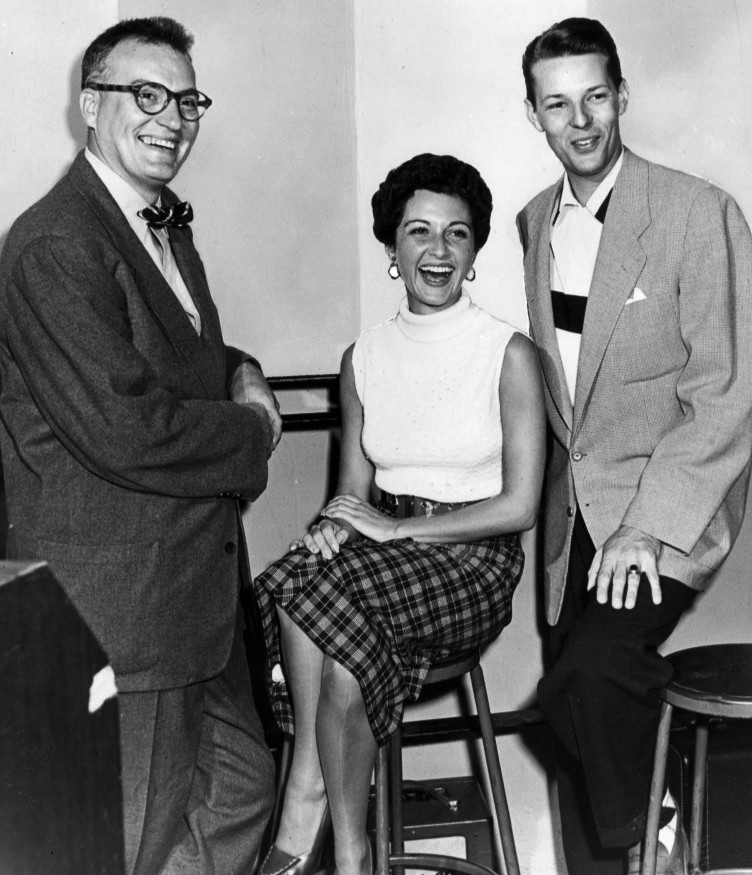
- Publicity photo of Dave Garroway, singer-actress Connie Russell and Jack Haskell from the WMAQ radio show, Dial Dave Garroway (1951)
- Other names: Reserved for Dave Garroway; Dial Dave Garroway; Fridays with Dave Garroway
- Genre: Variety
- Country of origin: United States
- Language(s): English
- Home station: WMAQ
- Syndicates: NBC
- Starring: Dave Garroway
- Announcer: Charles Chan
- Original release: 1947 – June 17, 1955
- Sponsored by: Armour and Company

The Dave Garroway Show is an American old-time radio variety program. It was broadcast on NBC from 1947 to June 17, 1955. The title is a generic name that can refer to programs that had other titles including Reserved for Dave Garroway, Dial Dave Garroway, and Fridays with Dave Garroway.

== Format ==
In a Billboard review of a 1947 episode of The Dave Garroway Show, Cy Wagner wrote, "Here's the show for those who want soothing, relaxing patter, top music and a meaty thought once in a while." He added that the program "accentuates the novel Garroway style and also gives the opportunity for some music arranged to fit the plan for a show that has an overall quiet, almost esoteric tone."

Sponsors included Armour and Company.

The program originated from WMAQ in Chicago, Illinois.

== Personnel ==
In addition to Dave Garroway as host, regulars on the program included Charlie Andrews, June Christie, Jim Fleming, Jack Haskell, Vivian Martin, and Connie Russell. The announcer was Charles Chan. Music was by the Art Van Damme Quintet.
