= Bob Banner =

American television producer (1921–2011)

- Born: August 15, 1921; Ennis, Texas, U.S.
- Died: June 15, 2011 (aged 89); Los Angeles
- Occupations: Television producer, writer and director
- Years active: 1948–1997

Robert James Banner Jr. (August 15, 1921 – June 15, 2011) was an American producer, writer and director. From 1967 to 1972 he co-produced The Carol Burnett Show.

== Life and career ==
Banner was a native of Ennis, Texas, and credited his hometown with providing him the opportunity to prepare for his career. In high school he accompanied every singer in town, played in the high school band and was part-time organist in the Presbyterian Church. He credited band director Thomas Granger as the mentor who gave the biggest push to send him on his way. While a junior in high school he assisted Granger in writing and arranging the school Alma Mater, "Maroon and White", that has lasted since 1937.

He attended Southern Methodist University where he arranged for the Mustang Band and the Pigskin Revue, directed Script and Score, and organized his dance band that toured with Interstate Theaters Production of College Capers, where he met his wife, Alice. He graduated in 1943.

After college, he served three years on a destroyer in the United States Navy conducting radar and sonar duties and became a Lieutenant (junior grade).

He received a masters from the theatre arts department of Northwestern University in 1948. With only eleven hours needed to obtain his doctorate degree, he opted to leave Northwestern to pursue a television career in New York City.

Banner began his career in television in 1948. While pursuing his PhD and teaching radio courses on campus at Northwestern University, Banner worked evenings in Chicago at local television station WMAQ as a production assistant on the children's show Kukla, Fran and Ollie. Advancements came quickly in those early days, and he soon became director of Garroway at Large, a local show that was picked up by NBC.

In December 1949, Fred Waring asked Banner to join him at CBS as producer/director of The Fred Waring Show. The challenge of working in this new experimental medium proved great enough to lure Bob away from academia.

While in New York, Banner also directed Omnibus, hosted by Alistair Cooke. The weekly series on CBS is often credited as the forerunner to television's cultural PBS network. In the early 1950s, he moved to Los Angeles when the once-experimental medium had matured and was heading west.

During the Golden Age of Television, Banner was one of the prime movers of variety programming. The Dinah Shore Chevy Show, which he produced and directed, garnered myriad awards including three Emmy Awards, two Christopher Awards, and two Peabody Awards.

In 1958, he formed Bob Banner Associates (BBA). BBA's first production was The Garry Moore Show with regulars Durward Kirby, Carol Burnett, and Marion Lorne. The program ran for 218 episodes and won several Emmys, including one for Carol Burnett.

In the early 1960s, Carnegie Hall was targeted for demolition and Bob was asked by Isaac Stern to produce a special to save the cultural landmark. Salute to Jack Benny at Carnegie Hall starred Isaac Stern, Eugene Ormandy and the Philadelphia Orchestra, Van Cliburn, Benny Goodman, and Roberta Peters.

This was quickly followed by another special Julie and Carol at Carnegie Hall, starring Julie Andrews and Carol Burnett which garnered three Emmys and the International Golden Rose Award.

Almost Anything Goes (adaptation of It's a Knockout) (Bob Banner Associates/ABC,. 1975-76). Regis Philbin was a "field reporter". A Junior Almost Anything Goes, with Soupy Sales hosting, in 1976-77 on weekend mornings followed, then a syndicated version with celebrities, “All Star Anything Goes,” in 1977-78 with Bill Boggs hosting.

== Death ==
According to the Associated Press, Banner died on June 15, 2011, in Los Angeles at age 89. Family spokeswoman Lauren Cottrell told the Los Angeles Times that Banner died of Parkinson's disease at the Motion Picture & Television Country House and Hospital retirement community in suburban Woodland Hills. In recent years, Banner lived with his wife, Alice in Calabasas, California. Their three sons, Baird, Robert III (deceased), and Chuck live in Cerrillos NM, and Abiquiu, NM.

== Posthumous lawsuits ==
A year after Banner's death, BBA filed a lawsuit against Carol Burnett's production company Whacko Inc. over royalty rights regarding the distribution of the syndicated half-hour show Carol Burnett and Friends on television, and The Carol Burnett Show and Mama's Family episodes on home video. Whacko, Inc. representatives have countered during ongoing litigation that Banner left the show after five years, and no sketches from those first five years have been included on Carol Burnett and Friends episodes, nor on any Burnett performances that were released on DVD until 2015. In 2015, episodes from the first five seasons of The Carol Burnett Show were issued on DVDs for the first time subtitled The Lost Episodes.

Whacko, Inc. has since sought, and received, an injunction barring BBA from marketing a DVD featuring Burnett's appearances on The Garry Moore Show from 1959 to 1962, during which she performed as a member of the program's ensemble cast. The complaint alleges that "...the DVD and its promotional artwork confuse the public by falsely suggesting that the starring performer on the DVD is Carol Burnett".

== Filmography ==
=== Producer credits ===
Film/Television	Year	Note
Real Kids, Real Adventures	1997	TV series (unknown episodes)
Amazing Music	1996	TV
Angel Flight Down	1996	TV
Happy Birthday, George Gershwin!	1995	TV
The Sea-Wolf	1993	TV
Uptown Comedy Club	1992	TV series
Yes Virginia, There Is a Santa Claus	1991	TV
Showtime at the Apollo	1987–1996	TV series (unknown episodes)
Star Search	1983–1986	3 episodes
Andy Williams' Early New England Christmas	1982	TV
Battle of the Las Vegas Show Girls	1981	TV
The Way They Were	1981	TV
Solid Gold	1980	TV series (unknown episodes)
If Things Were Different	1980	TV
The Darker Side of Terror	1979	TV
A Special Sesame Street Christmas	1978	TV
My Husband Is Missing	1978	TV
Bud and Lou	1978	TV
A Salute to American Imagination	1978	TV
Easter by the Sea	1978	TV
Perry Como, Las Vegas Style	1976	TV
The Carol Burnett Show	1967–1972	TV
Christmas in Austria	1976	TV
The Last Survivors	1975	TV
Journey from Darkness	1975	TV
Lisa, Bright and Dark	1973	TV
Thicker Than Water	1973	9 episodes
Mongo's Back in Town	1971	TV
My Sweet Charlie	1970	TV
John Davidson at Notre Dame	1967	TV
Warning Shot	1967	
Carol + 2	1966	TV
The Entertainers	1964–1965	TV
Once Upon a Mattress	1964	TV
An Evening with Carol Burnett	1963	TV
Julie and Carol at Carnegie Hall	1962	TV
Kings of Broadway	1962	TV
Diagnosis: Unknown	1960	TV series (unknown episodes)
Candid Camera	1960–1967	TV series (unknown episodes)
The Dinah Shore Chevy Show	1958	1 episode
The Dave Garroway Show	1953	TV series (unknown episodes)

=== Director credits ===
TV Series	Year	Note
The Dinah Shore Chevy Show	1958	1 episode
Producers' Showcase	1956	1 episode
The Dave Garroway Show	1953	TV series (unknown episodes)

=== Writer ===
Film/TV Series	Year	Note
Amazing Music	1996	TV
Happy Birthday, George Gershwin!	1995	TV

== Awards and honors ==
Other recognition over the years include:

- Doctorate of Fine Arts degree from Northwestern University
- Distinguished Service medal as VP of ATAS.
- Distinguished Alumni Award from Southern Methodist University
- Dallas TACA Award for Excellence in the Performing Arts
- 6 Christopher Awards
- 5 Awards of Excellence
- 1 Emmy Award
