= Tomorrow's Children =

- Directed by: Crane Wilbur
- Written by: Wallace Thurman
- Produced by: Bryan Foy
- Starring: Diane Sinclair; Donald Douglas; John Preston; Carlyle Moore Jr. Sterling Holloway; W. Messenger Bellis; Sarah Padden
- Cinematography: William C. Thompson
- Edited by: Arthur Hilton
- Color process: Black and white
- Production company: Foy Productions Ltd.
- Release date: July 1934
- Running time: 50 minutes
- Country: United States
- Language: English

The film

Tomorrow's Children, also known as The Unborn in the United Kingdom, is a 1934 American drama film written by Wallace Thurman and directed by Crane Wilbur. The film is critical of the eugenic policies in practice in the United States of the era. The film was widely deemed "immoral" and "tending to incite crime".

== Summary ==
The film follows the nature vs. nurture story of Alice Mason, played by Diane Sinclair, who wants nothing more than to settle down with her fiancé Jim Baker and raise a family. This goal crumbles when her parents are forced to undergo a permanent birth control surgery or lose their welfare checks. Alice represents the only real beneficial family member; her aging parents are lazy alcoholics and her siblings have physical and mental disabilities, or criminal ties. But she is told that she too must undergo surgery, as their family's corrupt bloodline must end.

Alice's parents grudgingly accept the court order, but Alice flees the house. The police soon catch her. Her fiancé Jim makes a bold case to Dr. Brooks, who testifies on Alice's behalf, but it doesn't change the court's decision. Another ally of Alice and Jim, Father O'Brien, begs Mrs. Mason to reconsider the decision to be sterilized. She refuses, desperate to keep receiving welfare, but she becomes so drunk that she reveals that Alice was a foundling the Masons took in, so she actually is not of their blood. Father O'Brien races to stop the procedure with the new information. Dr. Brooks is ultimately able to stop the procedure in time.

== Cast ==
- Diane Sinclair as Alice Mason
- Donald Douglas as Dr. Brooks
- John Preston as Dr. Crosby
- Carlyle Moore Jr. as Jim Baker
- Sterling Holloway as Dr. Dorsey
- W. Messenger Bellis as Dr. McIntyre
- Hyram A. Hoover as Spike
- Constance Kent as Nurse
- Lewis Gambart as Jeff
- Crane Wilbur as Father O'Brien
- Arthur Wanzer as Mr. Mason
- Sarah Padden as Mrs. Mason

== Production ==
The film was the sound film directorial debut of Crane Wilbur. Its subject matter was considered unacceptable in the film industry of the time, and did not meet the standards of the Association of Motion Picture Producers. Instead of being backed by this organization, Foy Productions was forced to present the film to state censorship boards located in New York, Ohio, Kansas, Pennsylvania, Virginia, and Maryland.

The film received negative attention for its prominent themes of genetic alcoholism, deformed offspring, and sterilization. The film was approved only in Pennsylvania and Ohio. Since Tomorrow’s Children deliberately ignored the standard rules of the industry of leaving these controversial topics alone, the film was denied its license and there was a lot of effort devoted to the delaying of its production. The Producers’ Association was responsible for most of the obstacles in the film’s course.

The original decision to ban the film came from censor Irwin Esmond and Dr. Frank Graves in the State Education department. The Appellate Division of the Supreme Court backed Esmond and Graves with three votes in favor of the ban and two against it. Years later in 1938, Foy Productions urged the US appeals court to revisit Tomorrow’s Children, especially in New York. Frederick Crane, of the appeals court, screened the film along with six others to decide its future in the empire state.

== Influence and controversy ==
The film has a very prominent theme of sterilization, or the loss of the ability to reproduce that eliminates the chance of parentage and future offspring. In the early 20th century, the US was flooded with ideals revolving around eugenics.

In 1927, the United States declared that it is in favor of these eugenic processes. Supreme Court Justice, Oliver Wendell Holmes, wrote, "...society can prevent those who are manifestly unfit from continuing their kind." This quote would be later used against the U.S. during the Nazi Nuremberg trials. Because the film is a reflection on the evils of society, it went against the status quo and took a stand. Criticizing sterilization and eugenic activities also meant criticizing the standard thought in American culture.

On August 19, 1934, barely a month after Tomorrow’s Children was released, Adolf Hitler, a known eugenics lobbyist, was the recognized sole-leader of Germany for over 1 1/2 years then. As Hitler began his conquest through Germany, the forced sterilization of the bloodlines of different races and religions of people occurred. Hitler’s ideals revolved around humanity becoming its purest by removing the parts he deemed unworthy. Although Hitler began his eugenic practices in 1936, Foy and Wilbur were able to relate the same message through the sterilization of Diane Sinclair's family in the film. Possible references to Hitler's regime in the film include a flag bearing what looks like the Nazi symbol in the background during a conversation between the two doctors. Foy Productions appealed its denied license in 1938 while the Nazi Aryan movement was still gaining power, resulting in the upholding of the decision of the film censorship board.
