= Cliff Norton =

American actor (1918–2003)

- Norton on The Monkees (1967)
- Born: Clifford Charles Nathan; March 21, 1918; Chicago, Illinois, U.S.
- Died: January 25, 2003 (aged 84); Los Angeles, California, U.S.
- Occupations: Actor; radio announcer
- Years active: 1949–1994

Clifford Charles Norton (born Clifford Charles Nathan; March 21, 1918 – January 25, 2003) was an American character actor and radio announcer who appeared in various movies and television series over a career spanning four decades.

== Early years ==
Born and raised in Chicago, Norton was one of three children born to Benjamin W. Nathan and Sophia Sholdar. He attended Sullivan High School, and graduated in 1935. His early jobs included selling shoes and working as a floorwalker. His first broadcasting experience came as a disc jockey on Chicago's WAAF. During World War II he was a bombardier in the U.S. Army Air Corps.

== Career ==
On old-time radio, Norton was probably best known as the announcer for Dave Garroway's radio program; Norton was also a member of the cast of Terry and the Pirates.

Norton started working on television in the 1950s. He was a regular on Your Show of Shows, Sid Caesar Presents Comedy Preview,Garroway at Large, Caesar's Hour and The Dave Garroway Show. He performed standup comedy on The Ed Sullivan Show and The Tonight Show. He was a regular panelist and presenter on the 1954 ABC game show What's Going On. He also had guest roles in series such as Studio One, The United States Steel Hour, The Alcoa Hour, and Kraft Television Theater. In 1952, he starred in the short-lived NBC comedy series The Public Life of Cliff Norton.

He was the star and announcer for the 1960s syndicated program The Funny Manns, which involved silent film footage used for broad comedic effect.

Throughout the 1960s, Norton guest starred on programs such as The Cara Williams Show, The Dick Van Dyke Show, Hogan's Heroes, The Munsters, The Monkees, The Lucy Show, and Bewitched. He also created and starred in a spoofing weather spot called Your Weather and Mine, which aired on KTLA in Los Angeles in 1963.

He had a regular role in the 1966–1967 sitcom It's About Time as "Boss", the chief of a prehistoric caveman tribe. He also provided the voice for the lead character, Ed Huddles, in Hanna-Barbera's 1970 animated prime-time series Where's Huddles?

In 1971, he appeared in the final episode of Green Acres; this episode was a backdoor pilot for another sitcom that CBS later rejected.

Norton appeared in several films in the 1960s and 1970s, including Kiss Me, Stupid (1964); Harlow (1965); Munster, Go Home! (1966); The Ghost and Mr. Chicken; The Russians Are Coming, the Russians Are Coming (1966); Suppose They Gave a War and Nobody Came (1970); Harry and Tonto (1974); Funny Lady (1975); and all-star comedy films such as It's a Mad, Mad, Mad, Mad World (1963) and Won Ton Ton, the Dog Who Saved Hollywood (1976).

In the late 1970s and early 1980s, Norton guest starred in shows such as The Feather & Father Gang, The San Pedro Beach Bums, The Odd Couple and Remington Steele.

== Death ==
On January 25, 2003, Norton died of lung cancer at his home in Studio City, California at age 84. He was survived by three children and four grandchildren.

== Filmography ==
Year	Title	Role	Notes
1952	The Public Life of Cliff Norton	Himself	Lead role
1954	What's Going On	Himself	Panelist
1958	Country Music Holiday	Morty Chapman	
1961	The Funny Manns	Himself/Various	Host
1962	The Dick Van Dyke Show	Game Warden	Season 2, Episode 11; "A Bird in the Head Hurts"
1963	It's a Mad, Mad, Mad, Mad World	Reporter	Scene deleted
1964	Kiss Me, Stupid	Mack Gray	
1964	The Munsters	Police Chief Harris	Season 1, Episode 3; "A Walk on the Mild Side"
1965	The Cara Williams Show	Various	2 episodes
1965	Harlow	Billy	
1965	McHale's Navy Joins the Air Force	Maj. Bill Grady	
1966	The Ghost and Mr. Chicken	Charlie, the Bailiff	
1966	Frankie and Johnny	Eddie	Uncredited
1966	The Russians Are Coming, the Russians Are Coming	Charlie Hinkson	
1966	Munster, Go Home!	Herbert	
1966–1967	It's About Time	Boss	Regular role
1967	Hogan's Heroes	Captain Kurtz	Season 2, Episode 23; "Everyone Has a Brother-in-Law"
1967	The Monkees	J. L.	Season 2, Episode 23; "The Picture Frame"
1967	The Lucy Show	Ike	Season 5, Episode 20; "Lucy the Fight Manager"
1968–1970	Bewitched	Various	7 episodes
1970	Where's Huddles?	Ed Huddles	Lead role; Voice over
1970	Suppose They Gave a War and Nobody Came	Herman Hyde	
1970	The Phantom Tollbooth	Kakofonous A. Dischord / Tollbooth Speaker	Voice
1971	Green Acres	Harry Grant	1 episode
1973	The Odd Couple	Lloyd	
1974	Harry and Tonto	Used Car Salesman	
1975	Funny Lady	Stage Manager	
1976	Won Ton Ton, the Dog Who Saved Hollywood	Dog Catcher	
1977	The Mouse and His Child	Crow #2	Voice
1977	The Feather & Father Gang		Season 1, Episode 6; "Never Con a Killer" (originally made as series pilot)
1977	The San Pedro Beach Bums		Season 1, Episode 4; "Godfathers Five"
1982	Pandamonium	Timothy	Voice
1983	Remington Steele	Morrie Singer	Season 1, Episode 15; "To Stop a Steele"
