= Jack Washburn =

American singer and actor (1927–1992)

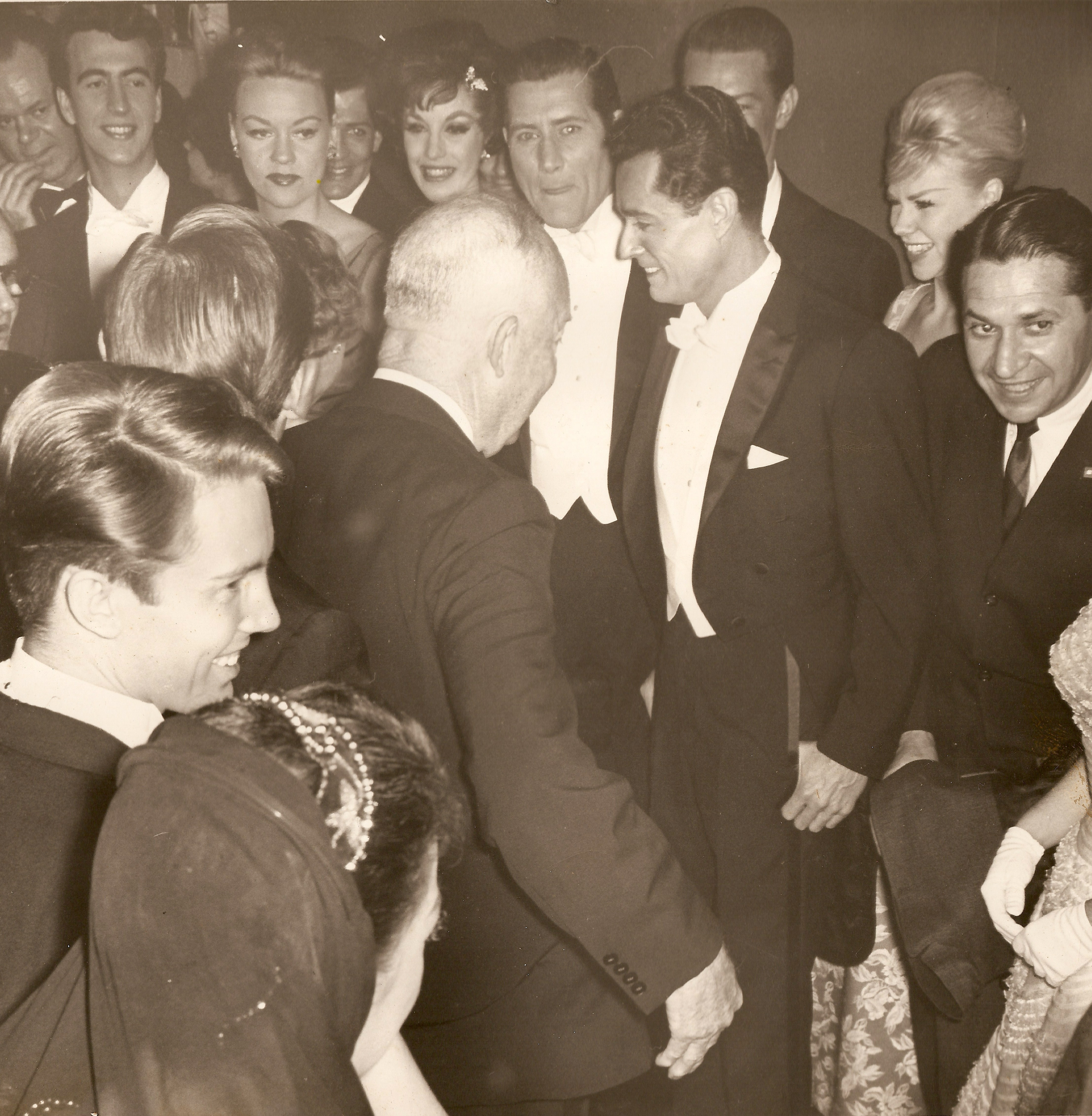
- Washburn in 1957

Background information
- Born: December 4, 1927; Rockford, Illinois, U.S.
- Died: March 15, 1992 (aged 64) New Hope, Pennsylvania, U.S.
- Genres: Musical theatre, light opera
- Occupations: Singer, actor

Jack Charles Washburn (December 4, 1927 – March 15, 1992) was an American singer and actor. He was best known for starring as Marius in the Broadway production of Fanny, and for originating the role of Youssein Davair in Irving Berlin's Mr. President.

== Early life and education ==
Born in Rockford, Illinois, he was the son of Benjamin Washburn, a civil service employee, and Marguerite Washburn (née Hocher) of Sacramento. (Note: Although Playbill.com lists Washburn's place of birth as Sacramento, California, The Biographical Encyclopaedia & Who's Who of the American Theatre (1966) lists his birthplace as Rockford, Illinois.) In 1945, Jack Washburn graduated from San Juan High School in Fair Oaks, California, and enlisted in the United States Navy. After serving in the Navy for one year, he studied singing with Easton Kent in San Francisco.

== Career ==
Washburn started his career singing on local radio in San Francisco. During the Korean War, he served in the United States Army at Fort Ord, where he entertained soldiers three to four times a day. Upon returning to the Bay Area, he performed extensively on local television, and became the resident singer at the Rumpus Room, a popular nightclub in San Francisco, replacing Rusty Draper.

Washburn entered the national spotlight in 1953, when he won first place on Arthur Godfrey's Talent Scouts. Soon afterwards, he sang on Godrey's daytime TV show, filling in for Julius La Rosa. More gigs followed at nightclubs including the Mayfair in Boston; Down Beat Club in Montreal; Conquistador in San Juan; Grossinger's in the Catskills; and the Little Club in New York City.

In May 1954, Washburn made his stage debut as Lieutenant Bumerli, the lead in the operetta The Chocolate Soldier, at the Music Circus in Lambertsville, New Jersey. That summer, he also performed the roles of Carl Van Dam in The Red Mill and Jack Negley in My Maryland. He was subsequently hired as an understudy for a new Broadway musical, Fanny.

=== Broadway and touring ===
In November 1954, Washburn originated the role of the clown and the sailmaker in the musical Fanny on Broadway, while also serving as the understudy for Marius, the juvenile lead role. In September 1955, he replaced William Tabbert as Marius, and continued in the role for 16 months. Warmly received by audiences, Washburn earned the nickname "Cinderella Boy" because so few actors win lead roles in their first Broadway show. On December 25, 1956, he joined the national tour of Fanny following its Broadway run, and continued with the West Coast company in the summer of 1957, performing with the Civic Light Opera Association in San Francisco and Los Angeles. A Sacramento Bee review of Fanny at San Francisco's Curran Theatre called Washburn "a strong and handsome actor with an impressive tenor voice who ought to go very far in the musical theater".

In 1963, Washburn appeared on Broadway again, originating the role of Youssein Davair in Irving Berlin's Mr. President. Playing a "caddish" diplomat who courts the character played by Anita Gillette, he had a solo, "Don't Be Afraid of Romance".

Although Mr. President was initially panned by critics, it proved popular with audiences, and the original cast album was lauded as a success. Critic Penny Larsen wrote: "Jack Washburn scores as Youssein Davair, the East Indian diplomat whose dark good looks, suave charm and exciting vocal delivery temporarily entrance the president's daughter – and no wonder." The show had 256 performances on Broadway before going on tour with Washburn reprising his role, along with original cast members Jack Haskell and Jerry Strickler.

=== Other works ===
In 1959 Washburn was one of the actors in the film The Black Orchid starring Sophia Loren; it was his only film appearance.

His other theatre credits acting alongside major stars included Annie Get Your Gun with Patti Page; Sweet Charity with Chita Rivera; as well as Forty Carats, Dial M for Murder, and Cactus Flower with Joan Fontaine. In the 1960s and 1970s, he appeared frequently in local productions in New Hope, Pennsylvania, and in Lambertsville, New Jersey.

== Personal life ==
In 1953, Washburn married model Diane Bagshaw of San Rafael, who was crowned Vintage Queen of California the same year. They first met at the Rumpus Room, where he was performing. The daughter of former Marin district attorney Albert Edward Bagshaw, Diane attended the College of Marin where she studied art, and started her career as a dress and swimsuit model at fashion shows for San Francisco designers. She made her photographic modeling debut as the 1953 vintage queen, after being chosen at the California State Fair in Sacramento, and worked with photographer Fred Lyon, who then lived in Sausalito.

Jack and Diane Washburn had two children, a daughter and a son. In 1961, they moved their family to a suburban home in New Hope, Pennsylvania. Despite the demands of his performance schedule, Jack coached his son's Little League baseball team and led a local Boyscout troop. Washburn died on March 15, 1992, in New Hope.
