= Dave Garroway =

American radio and television host (1913–1982)

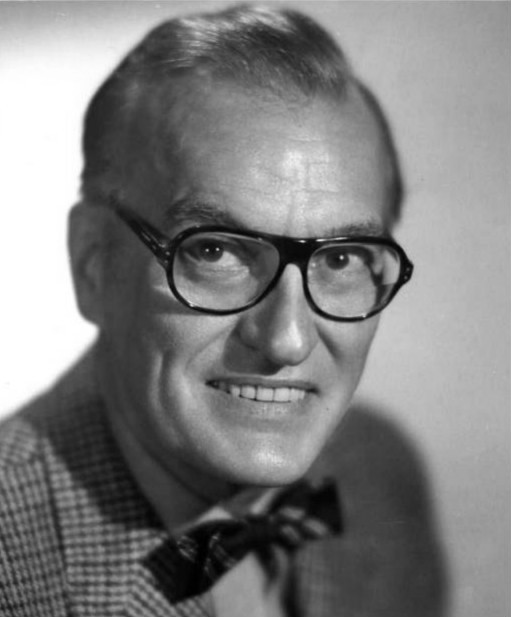
- Garroway circa 1970
- Born: David Cunningham Garroway; July 13, 1913; Schenectady, New York, U.S.
- Died: July 21, 1982 (aged 69); Swarthmore, Pennsylvania, U.S.
- Resting place: West Laurel Hill Cemetery
- Other name: The Roving Announcer
- Education: Washington University (BA)
- Years active: 1938–1982
- Known for: Host of Today (1952–1961); Host of Wide Wide World (1955–1958)
- Spouses: Adele Dwyer (m. 1945–1946); Pamela Wilde (m. 1956–1961); Sarah Lee Lippincott (m. 1980–1982)
- Children: 3

David Cunningham Garroway (July 13, 1913 – July 21, 1982) was an American radio and television host on NBC. He was the host of Garroway at Large from 1949 to 1951, the founding host and anchor of Today from 1952 to 1961, and the host of The Dave Garroway Show (TV program) from 1953 to 1954. His radio work included host of The Dave Garroway Show (radio program) from 1947 to 1955 and Monitor from 1955 to 1961. His easygoing and relaxing style belied a lifelong battle with depression. Garroway was honored for his contributions to radio and television with a star for each on the Hollywood Walk of Fame and the St. Louis Walk of Fame, the city where he spent part of his teenaged years and early adulthood.

== Early life ==
Born in Schenectady, New York, Garroway was of Scottish descent. By the time he was 14, he had moved with his family 13 times, finally settling in St. Louis, Missouri, where he attended University City High School and Washington University in St. Louis, from which he earned a degree in abnormal psychology. Before going into broadcasting, Garroway worked as a Harvard University lab assistant, book salesman, and piston ring salesman. After not being able to successfully sell either, Garroway decided to try his hand in radio.

== Career ==
=== Early years ===
Garroway began his broadcasting career at NBC as a page in 1938; he graduated 23rd in a class of 24 from NBC's school for announcers. Following graduation, he landed a job at Pittsburgh radio station KDKA in 1939. As a station reporter, he filed reports from a hot-air balloon, a U.S. Navy submarine in the Ohio River, and deep inside a coal mine. His early reporting efforts earned Garroway a reputation for finding a good story, even in unusual places. The "Roving Announcer", as he was known, worked his way up to become the station's special-events director, while still attending to his on-air work. After two years with KDKA, Garroway left for Chicago.

=== Radio ===
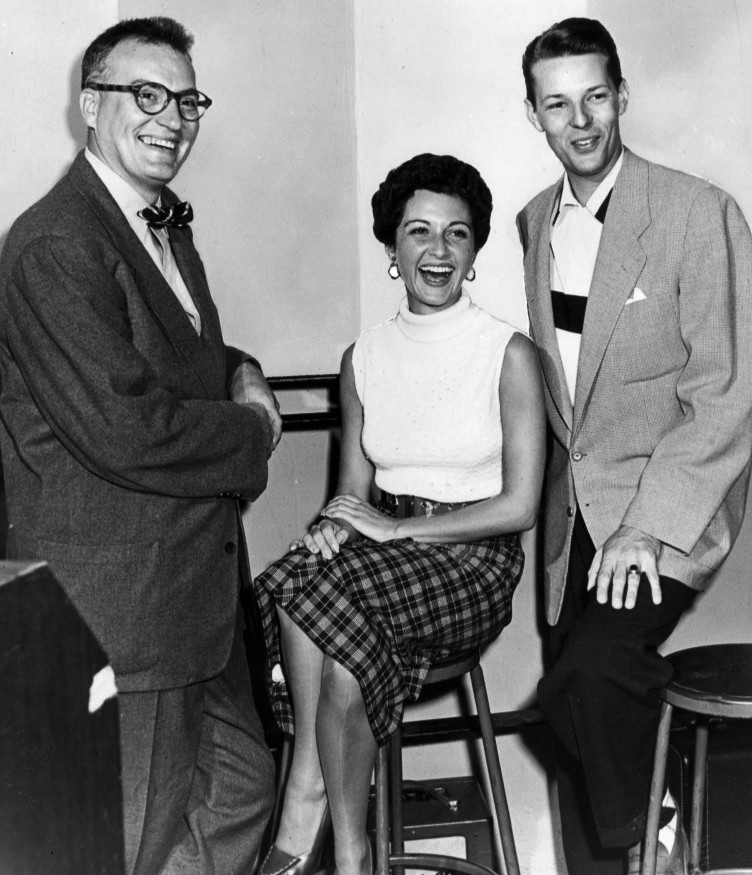
Garroway at Chicago's WMAQ in 1951 with Connie Russell and Jack Haskell

When the United States entered World War II in 1941, Garroway enlisted in the U.S. Navy, serving as a line officer. While stationed in Honolulu, he hosted a radio show when he was off duty, playing jazz records and reminiscing about the old days back in Chicago. After the war, Garroway went to work as a disc jockey at WMAQ (AM) in Chicago. Over time, Garroway hosted a series of radio programs, such as The 11:60 Club, The Dave Garroway Show, and Reserved for Garroway. One oddity Garroway introduced on his radio shows was having the studio audience respond to a song number not by applauding, but by snapping their fingers. Garroway also worked to organize jazz concerts, creating a "Jazz Circuit" of local clubs in 1947, bringing back interest in this music genre. His fellow disc jockeys voted him the nation's best in the 1948 and 1949 Billboard polls. He won the award again in 1951.

Garroway was the first "communicator" on NBC Radio's Monitor when the program first aired on June 12, 1955. He continued as the Sunday-evening host of the news and music program from 1955 to 1961. Garroway worked on the air at WCBS radio in 1964 and briefly hosted the afternoon rush-hour shift at KFI in Los Angeles from late 1970 to early 1971.

=== Television ===
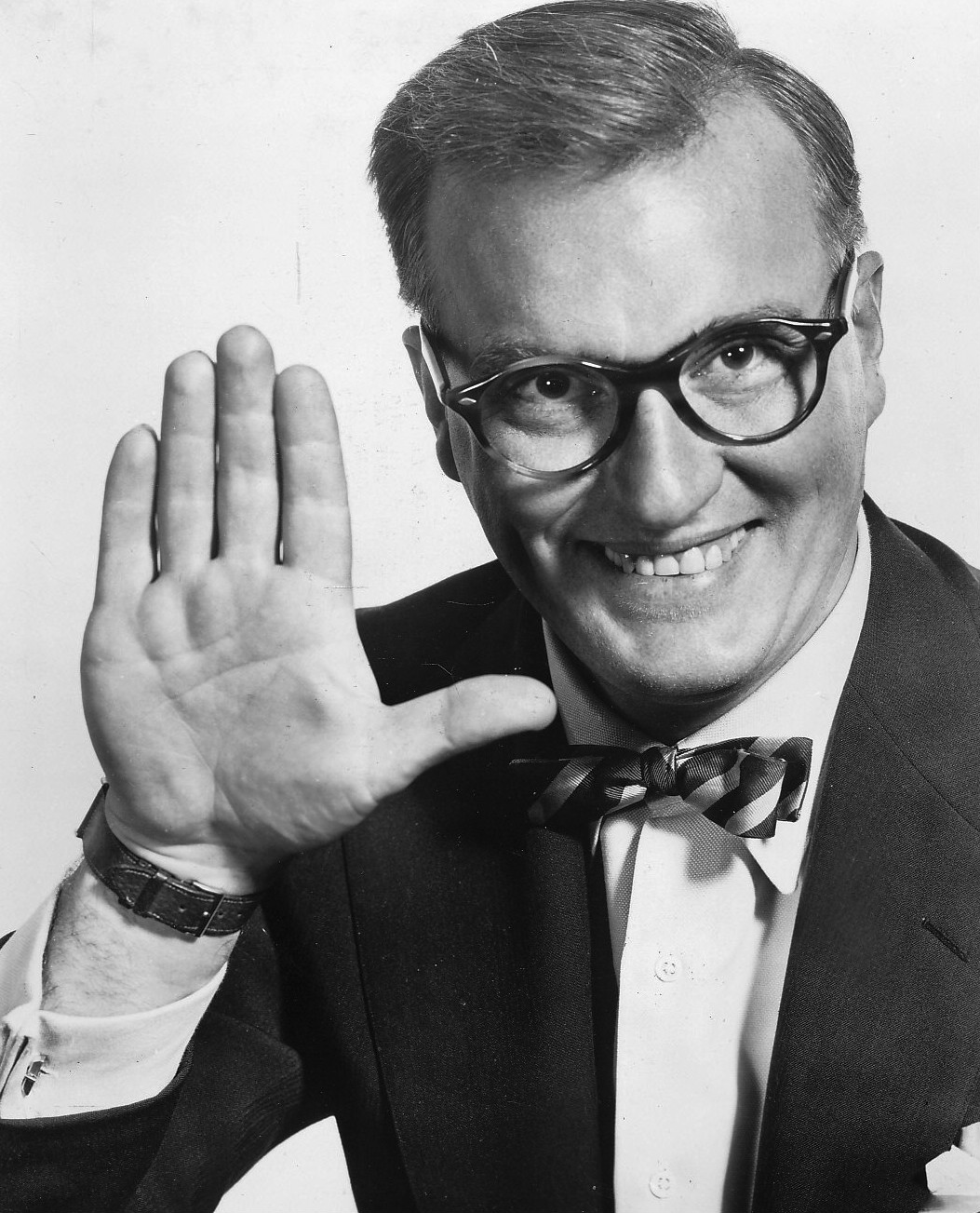
Garroway's signature upraised hand while saying "Peace"

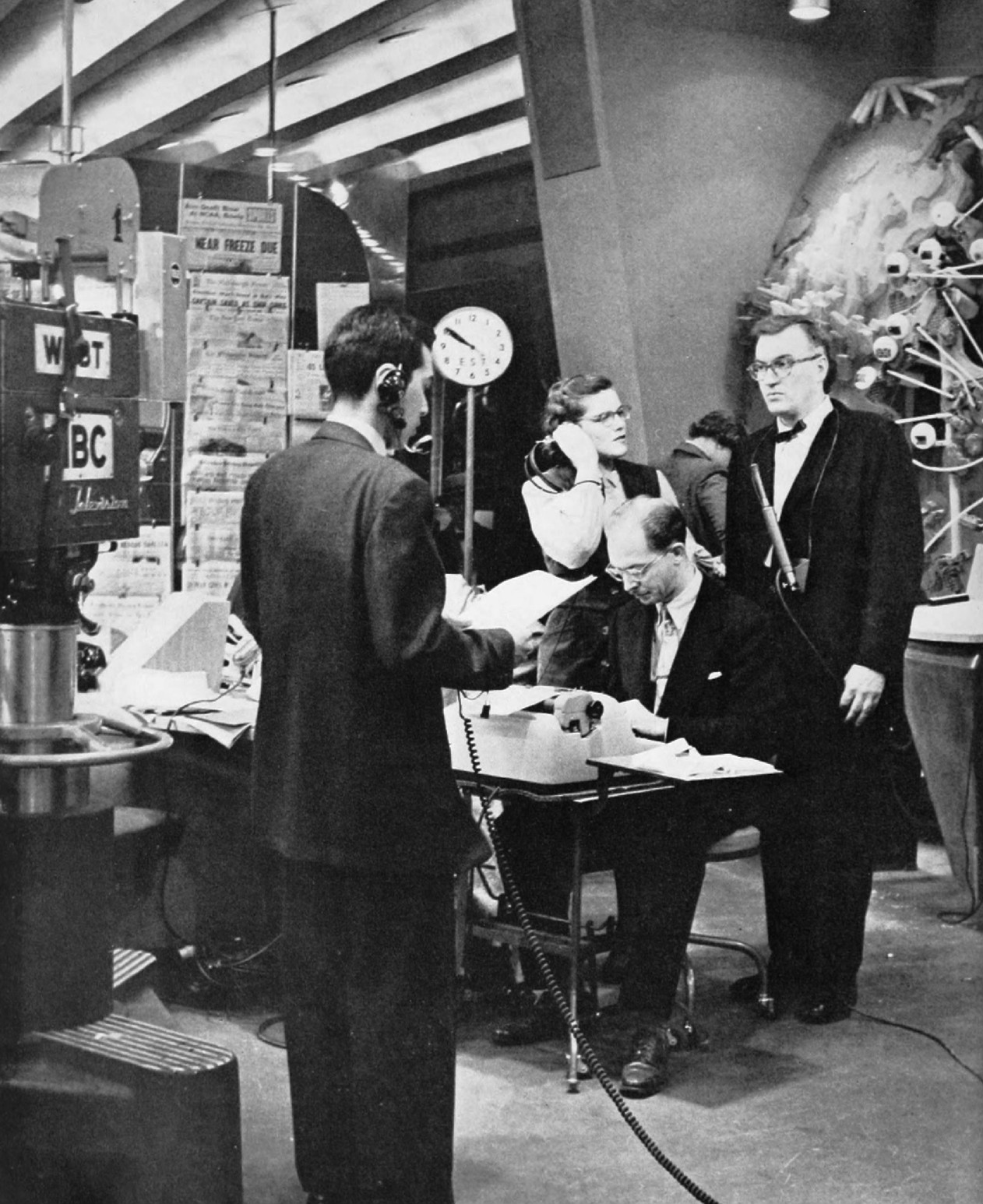
Garroway and crew on the Today show set (1952)

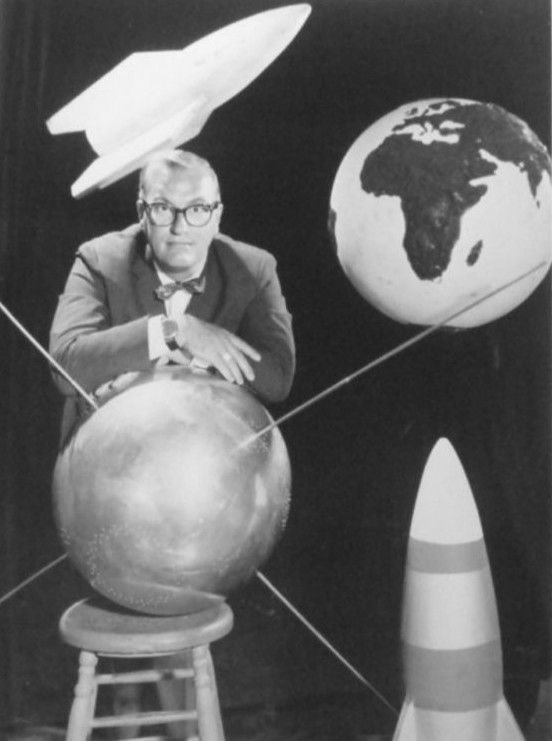
Garroway as host of Wide Wide World (1957)

Garroway was introduced to the national television audience when he hosted the experimental musical variety show Garroway at Large, telecast live from Chicago. It was carried by NBC from June 18, 1949, to June 24, 1951.

Garroway's relaxed, informal style when on the air became part of his trademark. In 1960, reviewer Richard F. Shepard of The New York Times wrote, "He does not crash into the home with the false jollity and thunderous witticisms of a backslapper. He is pleasant, serious, scholarly looking, and not obtrusively convivial". On television, Garroway was known for his signoff, saying "Peace" with an upraised palm.

Along with Arthur Godfrey, Arlene Francis, Steve Allen, and Jack Paar, Garroway was one of the pioneers of the television talk show. Television commentator Steven D. Stark traces the origins of the style to Chicago. Garroway, Studs Terkel, and Hugh Downs all hosted relaxed, garrulous, extemporaneous shows in that city in the early 1950s. Earlier radio and television voices spoke with an authoritative "announcer's" intonation, resembling public oration, often dropping about a musical fifth on the last word of a sentence. Garroway was one of the broadcasters who introduced conversational style and tone to television, beginning some broadcasts as though the viewer were sitting in the studio with him, as in this November 20, 1957, introduction for the Today show: "And how are you about the world today? Let's see what kind of shape it's in; there is a glimmer of hope".

Pioneering NBC president Sylvester "Pat" Weaver chose Garroway as the host of his new morning news-and-entertainment experiment, the Today show, in 1952. He was joined by news editor Jim Fleming and announcer Jack Lescoulie when the show debuted on Monday, January 14, 1952. Though initially panned by critics, Garroway's style attracted a large audience that enjoyed his easygoing presence early in the morning. His familiar "cohost", a chimpanzee with the puckish name of J. Fred Muggs, did not hurt his genial manner, but his concurrent seriousness in dealing with news stories and ability to clearly explain abstract concepts earned him the nickname "The Communicator" and eventually won praise from critics and viewers alike.

At the same time he did Today, Garroway also hosted a Friday-night variety series, The Dave Garroway Show, from October 2, 1953, to June 25, 1954. On October 16, 1955, he began hosting NBC's live Sunday-afternoon documentary Wide Wide World, continuing with that series until June 8, 1958. Another Friday-evening variety show, Dave's Place, was on the air in 1960. He also hosted a radio show, Dial Dave Garroway, that went on the air as soon as Today wrapped up each morning. Dial Dave Garroway had begun in 1946 when Garroway was still working for WMAQ in Chicago.

Garroway took Today to various locations during his tenure - Paris in 1959 and Rome in 1960; car shows and technology expos; plays and movies; and aboard an Air Force B-52 for a practice bombing run. Through television, Garroway gave viewers access to a variety of people that included politicians, writers, artists, scientists, economists, and musicians. In his role as Today host, Garroway acted as pitchman for several of the show's sponsors. Among them were Admiral television sets, Alcoa, and Sergeant's dog food. Most of the appearances were in the form of print ads in newspapers and magazines. By 1960, a board game called "Dave Garroway's Today Game" also was produced.

In 1961, Garroway hosted a special filmed program for the Billy Graham Evangelistic Association that traced Billy Graham's crusades from 1949 to 1960.

Garroway's relaxed demeanor on TV hid his depression. Toward the end of his professional career, he began to have disagreements with staff members; some days, Garroway would disappear in the middle of the Today broadcast, leaving colleagues to finish the live program. When Garroway's second wife, Pamela, died of a prescription-drug overdose on April 28, 1961, Garroway sank into a deeper emotional malaise. In late May 1961, Garroway resigned, announcing his intention to leave Today—either at the end of October when his contract was finished or sooner, if possible — to spend more time with his children. On June 16, 1961, Garroway left the morning show he helped pioneer.

=== Later career ===
After leaving Today, Garroway returned to television on National Educational Television (the forerunner of PBS) with a science series called Exploring the Universe in late 1962. Later, he went back to working in radio, doing "split-shift" shows called Garroway AM (midmornings) and Garroway PM (midafternoons) for WCBS (AM), New York. Garroway also started a magazine, National FM-Radio; the venture was a costly failure, with Garroway realizing he was not cut out to be a businessman. While he was in the publishing business, Garroway began reading various law books to try to understand what his lawyer was saying. His attorney told him that he had done enough legal reading to pass the New York State bar exam. On a bet, Garroway sat for and passed the written exam.

In April 1969, Garroway launched a daytime talk show on WNAC-TV, Tempo Boston, which he hoped would be picked up for national syndication. Stations in New York and Philadelphia agreed to pick up the show, but by early 1970, the small-scale syndication ended and Tempo was cancelled. The show had promise, but management instead decided to fill its time slot with old movies instead of more expensive local programming. After leaving the Boston airwaves, Garroway traveled to Southern California, hosting a music-and-talk show on KFI radio in Los Angeles. He planned to re-enter the television world with a CBS summer replacement show, Newcomers, but the show never made it past the summer of 1971. While in Los Angeles, Garroway began to take acting workshops; he had a role in an episode of the Western series Alias Smith and Jones as a judge in 1972.

Garroway appeared sporadically on other television programs without achieving the success and recognition levels he enjoyed on Today. He largely remained out of the public eye for the rest of the 1960s and 1970s, although he did re-emerge for Today anniversaries. His final such appearance was on the 30th-anniversary show, on January 14, 1982.

=== Other media ===
Garroway narrated a compilation of romantic songs performed by the Boston Pops Orchestra, Getting Friendly with Music, in 1956. He also served as narrator for special albums, including 1964's The Great Campaigners, 1928–1960 and 1960's Names From the Wars.

In 1960, Garroway wrote Fun on Wheels, an activity book for children on road trips. The book was revised and reissued in 1962 and 1964.

Toward the end of his life, Garroway planned to write an autobiography. The book never made it past the research stage; the surviving notes, manuscripts, audio tapes, and news clippings were sent to former Today researcher Lee Lawrence. Upon Lawrence's death in 2003, the boxes were turned over to the Library of American Broadcasting, Special Collections, University of Maryland Libraries, where they remained as of 2009.

== Personal life ==
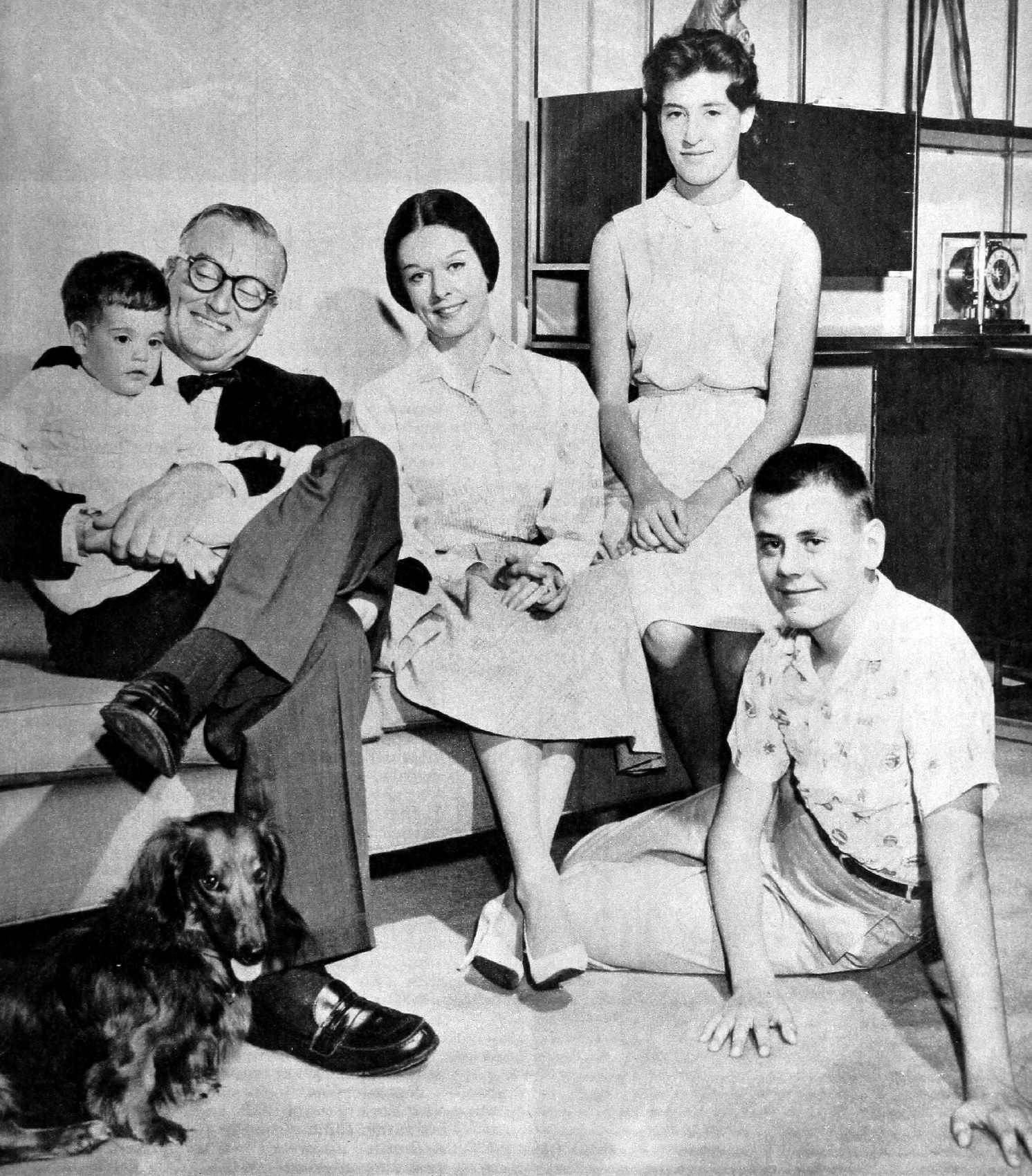
The Garroways at home in 1960. From left: Garroway with David Jr., wife Pamela, daughter Paris, and son Michael seated on the floor

=== Marriages and children ===
Garroway was married three times and had three children. His first marriage was to Adele Dwyer, whom he married in 1945. The couple had a daughter, Paris, before divorcing the following year. He married former actress and ballerina Pamela Wilde in 1956. They had a son, David Cunningham Garroway Jr., in 1958. Garroway later adopted Wilde's son Michael from her first marriage. Wilde died of a prescription-drug overdose on April 28, 1961. Garroway married astronomer Sarah Lee Lippincott in February 1980. They remained married until Garroway's death in 1982.

=== Interests ===
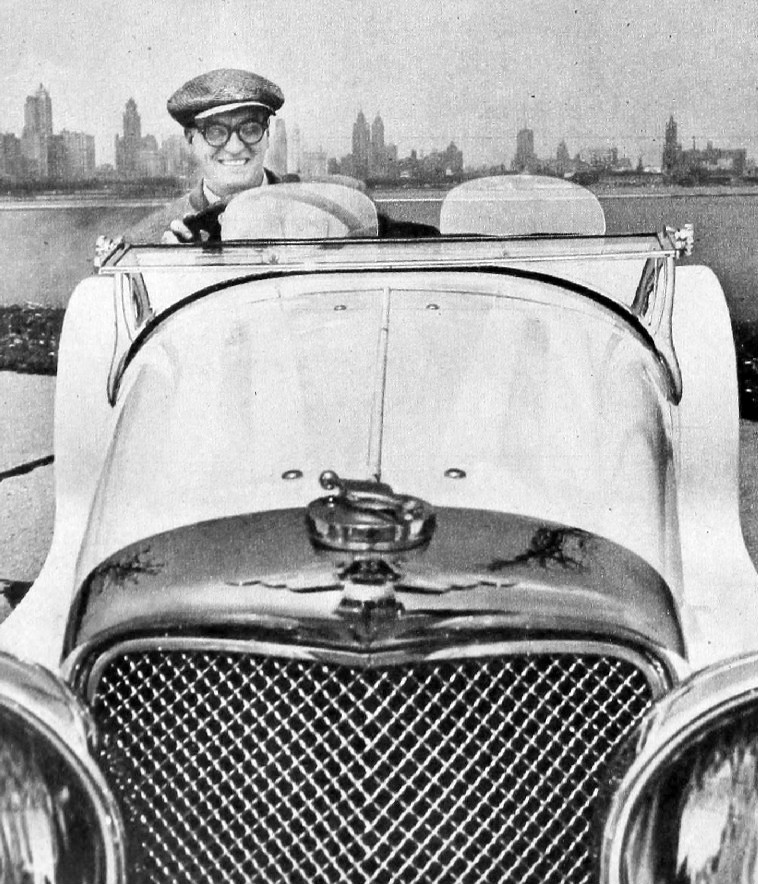
Garroway at the wheel of his favorite car, a 1938 SS Jaguar 100, which he restored

Garroway was very interested in astronomy, and during a tour of Russian telescopes, he met his third wife, astronomer Sarah Lee Lippincott. In his final years, he attended astronomy symposia at Swarthmore College and spent time at Sproul Observatory.

Garroway was also an automobile enthusiast, and one of his hobbies was collecting and restoring vintage luxury and sports cars. He was especially fond of his 1938 SS Jaguar 100, which he also raced in his spare time. Garroway was featured in several automobile commercials, including the first Chevrolet Corvette in 1953, and the Ford Falcon in 1964.

Garroway, a music lover and amateur drummer, lent his name to a series of recordings of jazz, classical, and pop music released in the late 1950s and early 1960s. Among them were Wide, Wide World of Jazz, 1957's Some of My Favorites, and 1958's Dave Garroway's Orchestra: An Adventure in Hi-Fi Music.

== Death ==
In 1981, Garroway underwent open-heart surgery, as a result of which he contracted a staph infection. On January 14, 1982, Today broadcast its 30th-anniversary special, which featured all of the important living, former, and current staff members. Garroway, who had recently undergone drug rehabilitation for an amphetamine addiction, appeared to be cheerful and in good spirits during the show. He also indicated that he would be present for the show's 35th anniversary in 1987.

A few months later, however, Garroway began suffering complications from the infection he had contracted during surgery. He spent some weeks in and out of hospitals and had an in-home nurse tending to him. On July 21, he was found dead of a self-inflicted shotgun wound at his Swarthmore, Pennsylvania, home. No suicide note was found and Garroway's nurse did not recall him being unusually depressed in the final day of his life. Garroway's son Michael said that his father had been experiencing complications from his heart operation and he had "unfortunately succumbed to the traumatic effects of his illness". In addition, he was extremely depressed at his inability to resurrect a TV career, saying to friends and family "I'm old hat, old news. Nobody wants old Dave anymore". He was interred at West Laurel Hill Cemetery in Bala Cynwyd, Pennsylvania, and his family held a private graveside service for him on July 28.

The July 22 edition of Today was mainly a remembrance of Garroway. His colleague Jack Lescoulie, news editor Frank Blair, and former consumer reporter Betty Furness offered tributes on the show. Garroway's death was noted on NBC Nightly News with Tom Brokaw and Roger Mudd. Commentator John Chancellor was the man who had replaced Garroway on Today 21 years earlier. On NBC News Overnight, host Linda Ellerbee closed the program with "Peace" instead of her usual "And so it goes".

Because of Garroway's dedication to the cause of mental health, his third wife, Sarah, helped establish the Dave Garroway Laboratory for the Study of Depression at the University of Pennsylvania.

== Parodies and fictional representations ==
Mad spoofed him in issue #26, November, 1955, as "The Dave Garrowunway Show".

In Robert Redford's 1994 film Quiz Show, Garroway was portrayed by Barry Levinson.

== Listen to ==
- Boxcars711: Dave Garroway narrates Names from the Wars (1960)

Preceded by None	Today Show Host; January 14, 1952–June 16, 1961	Succeeded by John Chancellor
