= Margaret Leighton =

British actress (1922–1976)

Margaret Leighton CBE
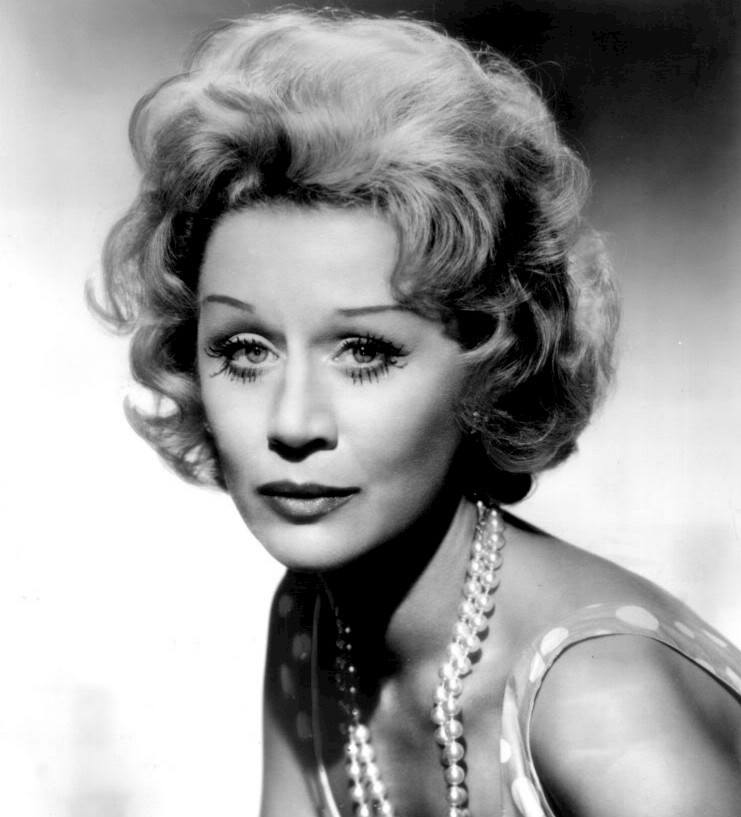
- Leighton in 1959
- Born: 26 February 1922; Barnt Green, Worcestershire, England
- Died: 13 January 1976 (aged 53); Chichester, West Sussex, England
- Years active: 1938–1976
- Spouses: Max Reinhardt (m. 1947; div. 1955) Laurence Harvey (m. 1957; div. 1961) Michael Wilding (m. 1964)

Margaret Leighton (26 February 1922 – 13 January 1976) was an English actress. Known for her work on stage and screen, her film appearances included Anthony Asquith's The Winslow Boy (her first credited film role), Alfred Hitchcock's Under Capricorn, Powell and Pressburger's The Elusive Pimpernel, George More O'Ferrall's The Holly and the Ivy, Martin Ritt's The Sound and the Fury, John Guillermin's Waltz of the Toreadors, Franklin J. Schaffner's The Best Man, Tony Richardson's The Loved One, John Ford's 7 Women, and Joseph Losey's The Go-Between and Galileo. For The Go-Between, she won the BAFTA Award for Best Actress in a Supporting Role and was nominated for the Academy Award for Best Supporting Actress.

Leighton began her career on stage in 1938, before joining the Old Vic and making her Broadway debut in 1946. A four-time Tony Award nominee, she twice won the Tony Award for Best Actress in a Play: for the original Broadway productions of Separate Tables (1957) and The Night of the Iguana (1962). She also won an Emmy Award for the 1970 Hallmark Hall of Fame television presentation of “Hamlet” starring Richard Chamberlain, which aired in November 1970 on NBC.

== Life and career ==
Born in Barnt Green, Worcestershire, Leighton made her stage debut as Dorothy in Laugh with Me (1938), which also was performed that year for BBC Television. She became a star of the Old Vic. Her Broadway debut was as the Queen in Henry IV (1946), starring Laurence Olivier and Ralph Richardson during a visit of the Old Vic to the U.S., and the company performed a total of five plays from its repertoire before returning to London.

After appearing in two British films, including the starring role of Flora MacDonald opposite David Niven in Bonnie Prince Charlie (1948) and in the popular The Winslow Boy (also 1948), the actress appeared in Alfred Hitchcock's Under Capricorn (1949) and the crime/mystery Calling Bulldog Drummond (1951). In the U.S., she portrayed the wife of a presidential candidate in The Best Man (1964).

Leighton won the Tony Award for Best Actress in a Play for her performance in Separate Tables (1956); she won another Tony in that category for The Night of the Iguana (1962), playing Hannah Jelkes (a role played by Deborah Kerr in the film version) opposite Bette Davis's Maxine Faulk. Leighton was nominated for Best Actress in a Play for Much Ado About Nothing (1959) and for Tchin-Tchin (1962). Her last appearance on Broadway was as Birdie Hubbard in a revival of Lillian Hellman's The Little Foxes (1967).

She had a noteworthy list of TV appearances, including Alfred Hitchcock Presents, Ben Casey and Burke's Law. She won the Emmy Award for Outstanding Performance by an Actress in a Supporting Role in Drama for Hamlet (1970) and she was nominated for an Emmy in 1966 for Outstanding Single Performance by an Actress in a Leading Role in a Drama for four episodes of Dr. Kildare. Her final TV performance was in the first season of Space: 1999 where she played Queen Arra in the episode "Collision Course."

For her film role as Mrs Maudsley in The Go-Between (1971), Leighton won the British BAFTA Film Award for Best Supporting Actress. She also received an Oscar nomination for Best Supporting Actress for the role. She received a BAFTA nomination for Best British Actress for her role as Valerie Carrington in Carrington V.C. (1954).

Leighton can be heard in Caedmon recordings of Noel Coward's Brief Encounter and scenes from Blithe Spirit and Present Laughter, all co-starring Coward himself; excerpts from George Bernard Shaw's The Apple Cart, again with Coward; Jean Cocteau's The Infernal Machine; and The Taming of the Shrew.

== Personal life ==
Leighton was married three times, to publisher Max Reinhardt from 1947 to 1955, to actor Laurence Harvey from 1957 to 1961, and to actor Michael Wilding from 1964 until her death in 1976. She had no children by any of the marriages.

She was appointed a CBE in 1974. Leighton died of multiple sclerosis in 1976, aged 53, in Chichester, Sussex.

== Acting credits ==
=== Film ===
Year	Title	Role	Notes
1948	The Winslow Boy	Catherine Winslow	First credited feature
1948	Bonnie Prince Charlie	Flora MacDonald	
1949	Under Capricorn	Milly	
1950	The Astonished Heart	Leonora Vail	
1950	The Elusive Pimpernel	Marguerite Blakeney	
1951	Calling Bulldog Drummond	Helen Smith	
1952	Home at Seven	Janet Preston	
1952	The Holly and the Ivy	Margaret Gregory	
1954	The Good Die Young	Eve Ravenscourt	
1954	The Teckman Mystery	Helen Teckman	
1954	Carrington V.C.	Valerie	
1955	The Constant Husband	Counsel for the Defence	
1957	The Passionate Stranger	Judith Wynter / Leonie Hathaway	
1959	The Sound and the Fury	Caddy Compson	
1962	Waltz of the Toreadors	Emily Fitzjohn	
1964	The Best Man	Alice Russell	
1965	The Loved One	Helen Kenton	
1966	7 Women	Agatha Andrews	
1969	The Madwoman of Chaillot	Constance	
1971	The Go-Between	Mrs. Maudsley	
1972	X Y & Zee	Gladys	
1972	Lady Caroline Lamb	Lady Melbourne	
1973	Bequest to the Nation	Frances Nelson	
1974	From Beyond the Grave	Madame Orloff	Segment: "The Elemental"
1975	Galileo	Elderly Court Lady	
1976	Trial by Combat	Ma Gore	Final film role; posthumous release

=== Television ===
Year	Title	Role	Notes
1938	Laugh with Me	Dorothy	BBC TV play
1947	Everyman	Beauty	BBC TV play
1948	Arms and the Man	Raina Petkoff	BBC TV adaptation
1951, 1953	Sunday Night Theatre	Catherine Bailey, Rosalind, Lucasta Angel	Episodes: "Release (I)", "As You Like It", "The Confidential Clerk"
1955	ITV Opening Night at the Guildhall	Gwendolen Fairfax	TV film
1955, 1960	ITV Play of the Week	Natalya Petrovna, Mrs. Manningham	Episodes: "A Month in the Country", "Gaslight"
1956	Theatre Royal	Marion	Episode: "The Triumphant"
1957	Suspicion	Miss Perry	Episode: "The Sparkle of Diamonds"
1958	Alfred Hitchcock Presents	Iris Teleton	Season 4 Episode 10: "Tea Time"
1959	Playhouse 90	Miss Kerrison	Episode: "The Second Man"
1959	DuPont Show of the Month	Millie Crocker-Harris	Episode: "The Browning Version"
1964	Ben Casey	Leila Farr	Episode: "August Is the Month Before Christmas"
1964	Burke's Law	Connie Hanson	Episode: "Who Killed Everybody?"
1965	The Alfred Hitchcock Hour	Nell Snyder	Season 3 Episode 13: "Where the Woodbine Twineth"
1965	Dr. Kildare	Chris Becker	Guest role (season 5)
1966	The F.B.I.	Amy Hunter	Episode: "The Chameleon"
1966	The Girl from U.N.C.L.E.	Gita Volander	Episode: "The Lethal Eagle Affair"
1968	A Touch of Venus	Rosemary	Episode: "All on Her Own"
1968–69	Play of the Month	Helen Lancaster, Mrs. Cheveley	Episodes: "Waters of the Moon", "An Ideal Husband"
1969	Judd, for the Defense	Mary Wright	Episode: "The Crystal Maze"
1969	The Wednesday Play	Florence Lancaster	Episode: "The Vortex"
1970	The Name of the Game	Amelia Rayner	Episode: "The King of Denmark"
1970	ITV Sunday Night Theatre	Gertrude	Episode: "Hamlet"
1972	Armchair Theatre	Lady Huntercombe	Episode: "Hot Summer: Do Not Sell"
1973	The Upper Crusts	Lady Seacroft	TV series
1973	Frankenstein: The True Story	Francoise DuVal	TV film
1974	Great Expectations	Miss Havisham	TV film
1975	Space: 1999	Arra	Episode: "Collision Course"

=== Select theatre credits ===
- Robert's Wife (1942) – Birmingham Rep
- Major Barbara (1942) – Birmingham Rep
- The Farmer's Wife (1942) – Birmingham Rep
- The Little Minister (1943) – Birmingham Rep
- Elusive Straw Hat (1943) – Birmingham Rep
- Ladies in Retirement (1943) – Birmingham Rep
- Robert's Wife (1943) – Birmingham Rep
- Heartbreak House (1943) – Birmingham Rep
- The Taming of the Shrew (1943) – Birmingham Rep
- The Beggar Prince (1943) – Birmingham Rep
- You Never Can Tell (1944) – Birmingham Rep
- As You Like It (1944) – Birmingham Rep
- Six Characters in Search of an Author (1944) – Birmingham Rep
- Uncle Vanya (1945) – New Theatre, London
- Richard III (1944–45) – New Theatre, London
- Henry IV, Part I and II (1945–46) – New Theatre, London
- Henry IV Part I and II (1946) – New York
- Uncle Vanya (1946) – New York
- Oedipus Rex (1946) – New York
- The Critic (1946) – New York
- Separate Tables (1954–57) – London, New York
- Variation on a Theme (1958) – London
- Much Ado About Now (1959) – New York
- The Wrong Side of the Park (1960) – London
- The Night of the Iguana (1961–62) – New York
- Tchin-Tchin (1962–63) – New York
- The Chinese Prime Minister (1964) – New York
- Slapstick Tragedy (1966) – New York
- Cactus Flower (1967) – Lyric Theatre, London
- The Little Foxes (1967–68) – New York
- Antony and Cleopatra (1969) – Chinchester Festival
- Michael Codron (1970) – Apollo Theatre, London
- Reunion in Vienna (1972) – London
- A Family and a Fortune (1974–75) – Theatre Royal, Bath, then Apollo Theatre, London.

== Awards and nominations ==
Year	Award	Category	Nominated work	Results	Ref.
1971	Academy Awards	Best Supporting Actress	The Go-Between	Nominated	
1954	British Academy Film Awards	Best British Actress	Carrington V.C.	Nominated	
1971	British Academy Film Awards	Best Actress in a Supporting Role	The Go-Between	Won	
1971	Kansas City Film Critics Circle Awards	Best Supporting Actress	The Go-Between	Won	
1966	Primetime Emmy Awards	Outstanding Single Performance by an Actress in a Leading Role in a Drama	Dr. Kildare	Nominated	
1971	Primetime Emmy Awards	Outstanding Performance by an Actress in a Supporting Role in a Drama	Hamlet	Won	
1957	Tony Awards	Best Leading Actress in a Play	Separate Tables	Won	
1960	Tony Awards	Best Leading Actress in a Play	Much Ado About Nothing	Nominated	
1962	Tony Awards	Best Leading Actress in a Play	The Night of the Iguana	Won	
1963	Tony Awards	Best Leading Actress in a Play	Tchin-Tchin	Nominated	

== See also ==
- List of Academy Award winners and nominees from Great Britain
- List of actors with Academy Award nominations
- List of British actors
- List of Primetime Emmy Award winners
