= This Is My Love =

1954 film by Stuart Heisler

- Directed by: Stuart Heisler
- Screenplay by: Hugh Brooke; Hagar Wilde
- Story by: Hugh Brooke
- Produced by: Hugh Brooke
- Starring: Linda Darnell; Rick Jason; Dan Duryea; Faith Domergue; Connie Russell; Hal Baylor
- Cinematography: Ray June
- Edited by: Otto Ludwig
- Music by: Franz Waxman
- Production company: Allen Dowling Pictures
- Distributed by: RKO Pictures
- Release dates: November 3, 1954 (Los Angeles); November 11, 1954 (United States)
- Running time: 91 minutes
- Country: United States
- Language: English

This Is My Love is a 1954 American drama film directed by Stuart Heisler, written by Hugh Brooke and Hagar Wilde, and starring Linda Darnell, Rick Jason, Dan Duryea, Faith Domergue, Connie Russell and Hal Baylor. It was released on November 11, 1954, by RKO Pictures.

== Plot ==
Vida Dove lives with younger sister Evelyn and brother-in-law Murray Myer, working in a diner he owns. A former beau of hers, Murray fell in love with her sister, married her, then became paralyzed from a car crash. He now suffers from frequent convulsions and is bitter and cruel to Vida, calling her a spinster and cajoling her to marry and move out.

Vida does have a boyfriend, Eddie Collins, but isn't crazy about him. She forms an instant attraction, however, when Eddie brings his handsome friend Glenn Harris to the diner. Glenn asks her out, but Vida is shocked to discover that Glenn is interested in the married Evelyn as well.

Murray has fits of jealous rage. He makes accusations against his wife when she comes home late. Vida is overjoyed when Glenn asks her on another date, then devastated to learn that Evelyn put him up to it, just to fool her husband. Vida can't believe her sister is going to steal a man she loves for the second time.

At home, Vida takes sleeping pills and neglects Murray, who goes into convulsions. Next morning, she finds him dead. A police investigation, however, shows that Murray received a fatal injection of poison before he died, and Evelyn immediately becomes their prime suspect. Vida refuses to help her sister, and Glenn comes to hate her for it. However, she seems to have a change of heart, and is last seen walking into the police station.

== Cast ==
- Linda Darnell as Vida Dove
- Rick Jason as Glenn Harris
- Dan Duryea as Murray Myer
- Faith Domergue as Evelyn Myer
- Hal Baylor as Eddie Collins
- Connie Russell as Herself
- Jerry Mathers as David Myer
- Susie Mathers as Shirley Myer
- Mary Young as Mrs. Timberly
- William Hopper as District Attorney
- Stuart Randall as Investigator
- Kam Tong as Harry
- Judd Holdren as Doctor Raines
- Carl Switzer as Customer
