= The Funny Manns =

The Funny Manns is an American syndicated television program that first appeared in 1961. It was hosted by comedian Cliff Norton and featured re-edited silent comedies. In the United Kingdom, the series was broadcast by the BBC.

There were 130 black-and-white, nine-minute episodes of The Funny Manns produced for syndication by California National Productions, a subsidiary of NBC. Local stations could show The Funny Manns once every weekday for 26 weeks, or twice a day for 13 weeks, which was then the broadcast standard.

The show was co-produced by Bobby Nicholson, formerly of NBC's Howdy Doody program. who sometimes performed in the show's skits with Norton.

== Synopsis ==
Each program would begin with Cliff Norton in costume as a member of the Mann family. The first name depended on the situation, like "Stubborn Mann", "Fisher Mann", or "Handy Mann", and Norton would address the viewer in that character. After his comic monologue, he would say, "I suppose you're wondering how I got into this kind of business. I learned everything I know from my (uncle/father/etc.), [Daring] Mann" (or whichever name fit the comedian in the silent footage). Then the silent footage would begin, followed by Norton returning in character to offer a short epilogue.

The silent stars appearing on the show included Snub Pollard, Poodles Hanneford, Billy Bevan, Oliver Hardy (minus his partner, Stan Laurel), Harry Langdon, The Three Fatties, and a young Mickey Rooney, introduced by Norton as "Mickey (Himself) McGuire".

The used of silent films was a popular format for children's television at the time, with three similar series then in circulation; Chuckle Heads, Mischief Makers, and Comedy Capers.
