= Nightmare (1956 film) =

1956 psychological thriller directed by Maxwell Shane

- Theatrical release poster
- Directed by: Maxwell Shane
- Screenplay by: Maxwell Shane
- Based on: And So to Death; 1941 story by Cornell Woolrich
- Produced by: William H. Pine; William C. Thomas
- Starring: Edward G. Robinson; Kevin McCarthy; Connie Russell
- Cinematography: Joseph F. Biroc
- Edited by: George A. Gittens
- Music by: Herschel Burke Gilbert
- Color process: Black and white
- Production company: Pine-Thomas-Shane Productions
- Distributed by: United Artists
- Release date: May 11, 1956
- Running time: 89 minutes
- Country: United States
- Language: English

Nightmare is a 1956 American film noir crime film directed by Maxwell Shane and starring Edward G. Robinson, Kevin McCarthy and Connie Russell.

The story is based on a novel by William Irish (a pseudonym of Cornell Woolrich). The book had been previously adapted as the 1947 film Fear in the Night, originally titled Nightmare, also written and directed by Shane.

== Plot ==
New Orleans big-band clarinetist Stan Grayson experiences a nightmare in which he sees himself killing a man in a mirrored room, while in the background haunting dirge-like music plays. He awakens to find blood on himself, bruises on his neck and a key from the dream in his hand.

Grayson tells his brother-in-law, police detective Rene Bressard, about the problem but is dismissed. Later, the two men take a picnic in the country with Grayson's girlfriend and sister. Grayson leads them to the empty house from his dream, and it begins to rain. After they find a record player and begin dancing, Grayson's girlfriend bumps into the phonograph, changing the speed. The slowed music becomes the song from Grayson's nightmare. They then discover that the house contains a mirrored room as in Grayson's dream. When he finds that a murder did indeed take place, Bressard suspects Grayson.

Grayson, stressed and suicidal, protests his innocence, which makes Bressard dig deeper. They learn that a hypnotist living in Grayson's building may have caused him to commit the murder. Bressard now must prove that although Grayson committed the murder, he was acting against his will.

== Cast ==
- Edward G. Robinson as Rene Bressard
- Kevin McCarthy as Stan Grayson
- Connie Russell as Gina, Stan's Girl
- Virginia Christine as Mrs. Sue Bressard
- Rhys Williams as Deputy Torrence
- Gage Clarke as Harry Britten
- Marian Carr as Madge Novick
- Barry Atwater as Capt. Warner
- Meade Lux Lewis as Meade
- Billy May and His Orchestra as Themselves

== Production ==
The film was the first production of Pine-Thomas-Shane Productions, a new iteration of Pine-Thomas Productions, which had been based at Paramount from 1940 to 1954. The company signed a contract with United Artists, but William H. Pine died. The company was renamed Pine-Thomas-Shane to reflect the contribution of long-time screenwriter Maxwell Shane, and the titular Pine was Howard Pine, William Pine's son. The film was intended as the first of three films for United Artists, with the others to be Lincoln McEever and The Mountain Has No Shadow, although these were never produced. Filming began on October 31, 1955.

Billy May and His Orchestra perform in the film as themselves. They also provide the theme song, "Nightmare in New Orleans."

Although Edward G. Robinson does not portray the hypnotist in the film, he was promoted as such in the film's promotional materials.

== Reception ==
In a contemporary review for The New York Times, critic Milton Esterow called the film "... a modest melodrama with some crooked turns but neat performances ..."

The Los Angeles Times called Nightmare "draggy" and wrote: "Its opening scenes are effective, but things go haywire fast."

== See also ==
- List of American films of 1956
