= Connie Russell =

American actress

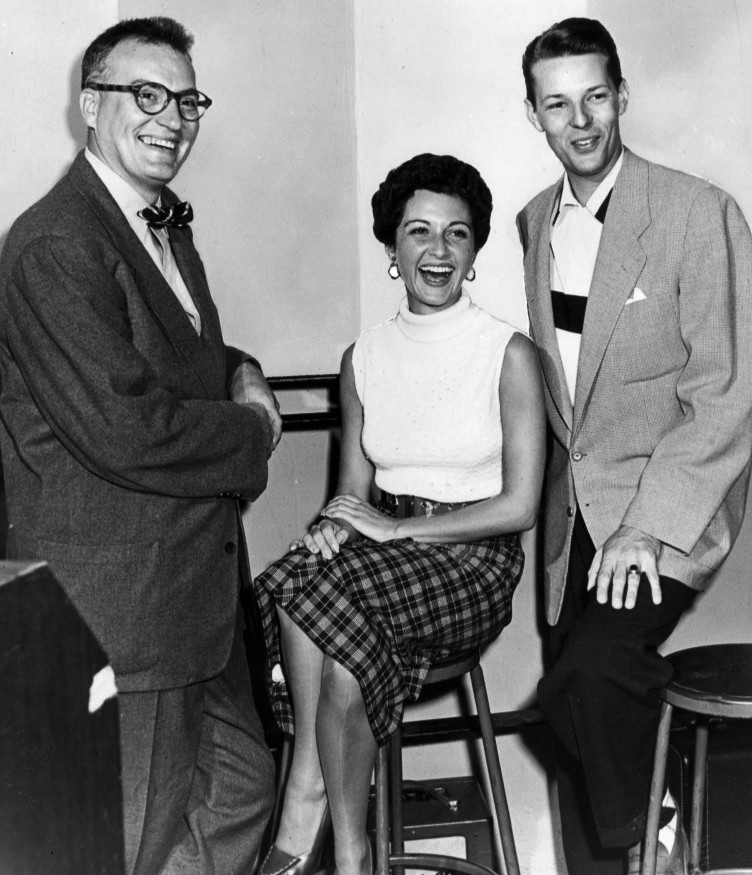
- Russell with Dave Garroway and Jack Haskell at WMAQ Radio in 1951.
- Born: May 9, 1923; New York City, US
- Died: December 18, 1990 (aged 67); Los Angeles, California
- Occupations: Actress; Singer
- Years active: 1937–1959
- Spouse: Mike Zimring
- Children: 3

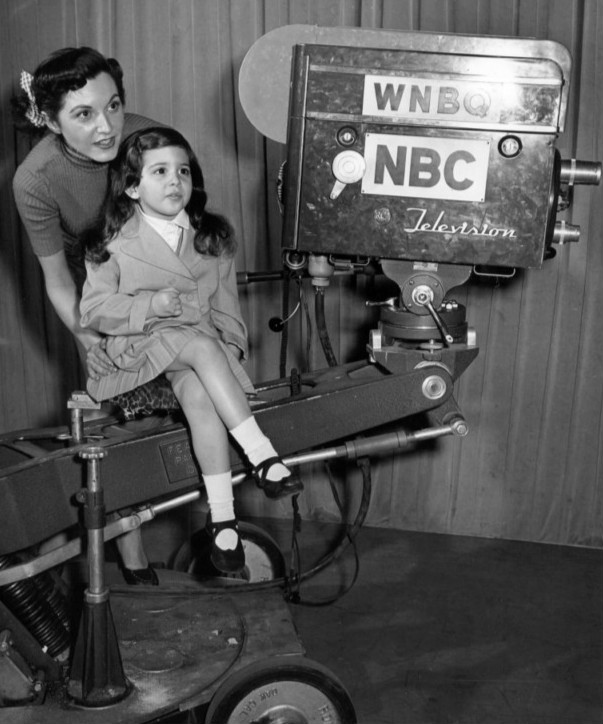
Connie Russell with daughter Austine (1951)

Connie Russell (May 9, 1923 – December 18, 1990) was an American singer and movie actress. Born in New York City, she appeared in seven films from the 1930s through the 1950s. She was far better known as a singer than as an actress, as her singing career was quite extensive.

== Early years ==
Russell was the daughter of Tommy and Nina Russell, a vaudeville team. Her grandparents were also entertainers, performing as Glenroy and Russell. She attended Lawrence High School in Cedarhurst, Long Island, and the Professional Children's School in New York City.

== Personal appearances ==
While she was still a teenager, Russell performed at venues such as the Starlight Club at New York's Waldorf-Astoria, the 500 Club in Atlantic City, New Jersey, the Famous Door, and the Paramount Theater in New York City. In late December, 1952, she appeared, along with Danny Thomas, Lou Wills, Jr., and Ray Sinatra and his orchestra, at the opening night gala of the Copa Room at the Sands Hotel and Casino in Las Vegas.

== Film ==
By the time she was 16, Russell had signed a contract with Metro-Goldwyn-Mayer. Her film debut came in Cruisin' Down the River (1953). (Another source says that her "first socko movie appearance was in Lady Be Good" in 1941.) She played a lead role in the 1956 movie Nightmare.

== Radio ==
On radio, Russell was the featured female singer on Let Yourself Go on CBS (1944–1945). She also appeared frequently on the syndicated Naval Air Reserve Show. In 1947, she became a network staff singer on NBC, joining Manor House Summer Party for an eight-week stint as the program's featured singer.

== Television ==
On television, she was a regular singer on Club Embassy, Garroway at Large (1949–1951) and on The Buick-Berle Show on NBC (1953–1955). She also had success on Eddie Cantor's TV program when he liked her so well in a guest appearance that he signed her to a contract.

Probably her best known role was uncredited. She played the singing voice for the sexy Red Riding Hood on the Tex Avery directed 1943 "Red Hot Riding Hood" cartoon playing opposite the Big Bad Wolf in a 1940s nightclub. The cartoon became Avery's most well known and was voted as number 7 of The 50 Greatest Cartoons of all time.

In the cartoon, she sings a rendition of "Daddy" by Bobby Troup. The speaking voice for the character was played by Sara Berner.

Russell appeared on an April 5, 1959, episode of the popular NBC variety show, The Steve Allen Show, singing her song “You’ve Changed” off her new album “Don’t Smoke in Bed”. She also did a short live cigarette commercial parody and appeared alongside Don Knotts, Lenny Bruce and The Three Stooges in the closing musical segment.[10]

== Selected filmography ==
- Lady Be Good (1941)
- This Is My Love (1954)
