= Tony Award for Best Stage Technician =

American theatre award for Broadway

- Awarded for: Best Stage Technician
- Location: United States New York City
- Presented by: American Theatre Wing The Broadway League
- Currently held by: Solly Pernick for Mr. President (1963)
- Website: TonyAwards.com

The Tony Award for Best Stage Technician was awarded to acknowledge the contributions of stage technicians in both musicals and plays. The award was first given in 1948 and last presented in 1963.

== Winners and nominees ==
indicates the winner

=== 1940s ===
Year	Technician	Production
1948; 2nd Tony Awards
1948; 2nd Tony Awards	George Gebhardt	N/A
1949; 3rd Tony Awards	—N/a	

=== 1950s ===
Year	Technician	Production
1950; 4th Tony Awards
1950; 4th Tony Awards	Joe Lynn	Miss Liberty
1951; 5th Tony Awards
1951; 5th Tony Awards	Richard Raven	The Autumn Garden
1952; 6th Tony Awards
1952; 6th Tony Awards	Peter Feller	Call Me Madam
1953; 7th Tony Awards
1953; 7th Tony Awards	Abe Kurnit	Wish You Were Here
1954; 8th Tony Awards
1954; 8th Tony Awards	John Davis	Picnic
1955; 9th Tony Awards
1955; 9th Tony Awards	Richard Rodda	Peter Pan
1956; 10th Tony Awards
1956; 10th Tony Awards	Harry Green	Damn Yankees
1956; 10th Tony Awards	Harry Green	Middle of the Night
1957; 11th Tony Awards
1957; 11th Tony Awards	Howard McDonald (posthumous)	Major Barbara
1958; 12th Tony Awards
1958; 12th Tony Awards	Harry Romar	Time Remembered
1959; 13th Tony Awards
1959; 13th Tony Awards	Sam Knapp	The Music Man

=== 1960s ===
Year	Technician	Production
1960; 14th Tony Awards
1960; 14th Tony Awards	John Walters	The Miracle Worker
1961; 15th Tony Awards
1961; 15th Tony Awards	Teddy Van Bemmel	Becket
1962; 16th Tony Awards	—N/a	
1963; 17th Tony Awards
1963; 17th Tony Awards	Solly Pernick	Mr. President

== See also ==
- Tony Awards
- List of Tony Award-nominated productions
