= Edward Kook =

American stage lighting engineer

Edward F. Kook (1903–1990) was an American stage lighting engineer who helped to develop the art form, receiving a Special Tony Award for his contributions in 1952. He was a lecturer in it at two Ivy League universities, Columbia University and Yale School of Drama, and was president of the United States Institute for Theatre Technology from 1975 to 1977.
