= Joseph Lynn =

English cricketer

Personal information
- Born: 15 February 1856; Newington, Surrey, England
- Died: 2 February 1927 (aged 70); Southampton, Hampshire, England

Domestic team information
- Years: Team
- 1875: Hampshire

Career statistics
Competition	First-class
Matches	1
Runs scored	4
Batting average	4.00
100s/50s	0/0
Top score	4*
Balls bowled	84
Wickets	2
Bowling average	17.00
5 wickets in innings	0
10 wickets in match	0
Best bowling	2/25
Catches/stumpings	1/–
- Source: Cricinfo, 6 January 2010

Joseph Lynn (15 February 1856 — 2 February 1927) was an English first-class cricketer.

Lynn was born at Newington in February 1856. He later played in a single first-class cricket match for Hampshire against Sussex at Hove in 1875. Batting twice in the match, he ended Hampshire's first innings of 106 all out unbeaten on 4, while in their second innings of 113 all out, he was dismissed without scoring by James Lillywhite. Although wicketless in Sussex's first innings, he did take the wickets of Frederick Greenfield and Henry Phillips for the cost of 25 runs in their second innings, to help Hampshire to a 28 runs victory. Lynn died at Southampton in February 1927.
