= Peter Feller =

Peter L. Feller (November 7, 1919 – March 13, 1998) was an American theatrical set builder who worked primarily on Broadway.

== Early career ==
Feller was a third-generation theatre technician. His grandfather and father both worked as set builders. Feller's father, also named Peter, was a stagehand at the Metropolitan Opera House. Feller began building sets when he was 15. His father got him a job with Vail Scenic where he worked on Jimmy Durante's show "Jumbo" at the Hippodrome. Feller joined the Army during World War II. He applied for the Irving Berlin musical, This Is the Army. Berlin had worked with Feller's father on Yip Yip Yaphank during World War I and hired Feller as the head technician for the show. Feller toured the world as a master sergeant. After World War II, Feller worked at Imperial Scenic Studio as a head carpenter for nine years before starting his own business.

== Feller Scenic Studios ==
Feller was the owner of Feller Scenery Studios in the Bronx. He acquired the shop, which was previously a metalworking shop, around 1960. Feller created unique and huge Christo-Vac thermo-forming machines to make the walls for the Vatican Pavilion at the 1964 World's Fair in New York City. Feller Scenery Studios became a one-stop-shop for theatrical designers when it merged with Costume Associates, which was owned by Feller's wife, Katy. By the mid-1970s, the studio was building sets for almost half the shows being produced on Broadway, and employed anywhere from 35 to 130 workers depending on the work-load.

Feller innovated the use of electronically operated winches for moving scenery around the stage and was among the first theatrical set builders to spot the stage potential of plastics. He used the vacuum forming machines to create a plastic set of armor for Man of La Mancha. In 1975, the company changed its name from Feller Scenery Studio, Inc., to Theater Techniques, Inc., when it moved from the Bronx to an abandoned hangar in Stewart Airport in Newburgh, New York. The Rolling Stones were rehearsing in the space and brought Feller up to build their set. Feller liked the space and decided to move in. Feller's son, Peter, owns Feller Precision, a theatrical engineering company that grew out of Feller Scenery Studio. His other son, Philip, was a stagehand on Cats for most of its run. When Feller Scenery was forced into bankruptcy, Feller divided his company between each of his department heads. His head sculptor, Nino Novellino, received the Christo-Vac. Nino and his wife, Mary, eventually moved the firm where the new company was named Costume Armour. Roger Gray, another ex-Feller employee, began Center Line Studios in 1987 just next door to Novellino.

== Theatrical career ==
Feller was the stage mechanic and designer for more than 1,000 Broadway shows. He worked on Fiddler on the Roof, West Side Story, Fiorello!, Cabaret, Sweeney Todd, and Cats, among other shows. He built sets for Shakespeare in the Park and numerous operas.

== Awards ==
In 1952, Feller won the Tony Award for Best Stage Technician for Call Me Madam. In 1984, he won a Special Tony Award in recognition of his "theater stagecraft and magic".

== Personal life ==
He was born in New York City on November 7, 1919. His wife was Katherine "Kay" Feller. Together, they had two sons, Peter and Philip, and three granddaughters. Feller had two sisters. He died in 1998, at the age of 78, in Melbourne, Florida, where he was living. His memorial service was held at the Winter Garden Theater, where Cats was performing.
