= Tchin-Tchin =

Play written by François Billetdoux

- Original language: French
- Written by: François Billetdoux
- Setting: Paris, 1950s.

Premiere
- Date: January 26, 1959
- Place: Théâtre de Poche in Montparnasse, Paris

Tchin-Tchin, also known as Chin-Chin, is a Paris-based romantic comedy by François Billetdoux (1927–1991). Directed by François Darbon and designed by Francine Gaillard-Risler, it premiered at the Théâtre de Poche in Montparnasse, Paris, on January 26, 1959. The author himself played the role of Cesareo Grimaldi, and Katharina Renn played Pamela Pusey-Picq.

== UK and U.S. productions ==
Adapted by Willis Hall as Chin-Chin, the play opened at Wyndham's Theatre in London's West End on November 3, 1960, running until the following March with Celia Johnson and Anthony Quayle in the leads; directed by Howard Sackler, the production was designed by Sean Kenny. According to Theatre World editor Frances Stephens: "There was a haunting quality about this new play … and Celia Johnson has done nothing better than her brilliant and sensitive portrayal of the inhibited Englishwoman who goes to pieces when her French doctor husband deserts her ... Anthony Quayle was also superb." In The Stage, R. B. Marriott pointed out that "Celia Johnson had her finest part of recent years, and played it flawlessly, in Chin-Chin ... which, starting its run haltingly after a mixed reception, developed, I am glad to say, into a success." A different translation, by Mark Rudkin, was published in the UK by Secker and Warburg. This version transferred the setting, with Billetdoux's blessing, from Paris to New York.

Adapted by Sidney Michaels as Tchin-Tchin, the play opened on Broadway on October 25, 1962, at the Plymouth Theatre (later transferring to the Ethel Barrymore Theatre) and closing on May 18, 1963, after 225 performances. Directed by Peter Glenville, the play starred Margaret Leighton and Anthony Quinn, with Charles Grodin in a supporting role. Arlene Francis and Jack Klugman took over the star roles for the last month. Tchin-Tchin received Tony Award nominations for Best Play, Best Actress in a Play (Leighton), Best Scenic Design (Will Steven Armstrong) and Best Direction of a Play. Time wrote: "Tchin-Tchin is magical. It is also fragile, but it is saved from wispiness by Leighton and Quinn. Excellence is an acting habit with Margaret Leighton, and her Pamela is expectably perfect. Anthony Quinn brings his subtlest gifts to Caesario [sic], a character in whom anguish and sentiment sprout like city flowers between slabs of concrete."

In 2013, the Willis Hall version of Chin-Chin was revived with Felicity Kendal and Simon Callow, directed by Michael Rudman and designed by Michael Taylor. The first night was at the Theatre Royal Windsor, Berkshire, on 16 October prior to a UK tour.

== Plot ==
Pamela and Cesareo's respective spouses are having an affair. When they discover this, they meet. The initially priggish English lady is slowly seduced by the vibrant Italian. Unfortunately, his joie-de-vivre is mainly due to alcohol and she too becomes dependent on it, initiating a decline and fall.

== Film ==
A Fine Romance (1991) with Julie Andrews and Marcello Mastroianni, directed by Gene Saks and adapted by Ronald Harwood.

== Awards and nominations ==
=== Original Broadway production ===
| Year | Award | Category | Nominee | Result |
|---|---|---|---|---|
| 1963 | Tony Award | Best Play | | Nominated |
| 1963 | Tony Award | Best Actress in a Play | Margaret Leighton | Nominated |
| 1963 | Tony Award | Best Scenic Design | Will Steven Armstrong | Nominated |
| 1963 | Tony Award | Best Direction of a Play | Peter Glenville | Nominated |
