= Stop the World – I Want to Get Off =

1961 musical by Leslie Bricusse and Anthony Newley

- Original 1961 London cast recording
- Music: Leslie Bricusse; Anthony Newley
- Lyrics: Leslie Bricusse; Anthony Newley
- Book: Leslie Bricusse; Anthony Newley
- Productions: 1961 West End; 1962 Broadway; 1966 Film; 1978 Broadway revival

Stop the World – I Want to Get Off is a 1961 musical with a book, music, and lyrics by Leslie Bricusse and Anthony Newley. In 1966 Warner Bros. released a film adaptation of the play. In 1996, a film version was produced for TV, made for the A&E Network.

According to Oscar Levant, the play's title was derived from a graffito.

== Plot ==
The show, set against a circus backdrop, focuses on Littlechap from the moment of his birth until his death. Each time something unsatisfactory happens, he calls out "Stop the world!" and addresses the audience. His progress through school, like his birth, having been briefly portrayed, he first finds work as an office helper performing menial tasks, or tea boy. A little later, his first major step toward improving his lot is to marry his boss' daughter Evie after getting her pregnant out of wedlock; now saddled with the responsibilities of a family, he is given a job in his father-in-law's factory. He has two daughters, Susan and Jane, but truly longs for a son. He allows his growing dissatisfaction with his existence to lead him into the arms of various women in his business travels—Russian official Anya, German domestic Ilse, and American cabaret singer Ginnie—as he searches for something better than he has. He becomes rich and successful and is elected to public office. Only in his old age does he realize that what he has had all along, the love of his wife, was more than enough to sustain him. But Evie dies. Littlechap comes to terms with his own selfishness while writing his memoirs. As death approaches, he watches his second daughter give birth to a son. When the boy nearly dies, Littlechap intervenes and allows Death to take him instead. In that final moment, Littlechap mimes his own birth, beginning the cycle once again.

== Production history ==
Opening originally in Manchester, England, the production transferred to the West End of London and opened on July 20, 1961, at what was historically called the Queen's Theatre. Directed by Newley, it ran for 485 performances. Newley starred as Littlechap, with Anna Quayle playing the multiple roles of Evie and the other women in his life. Marti Webb made her West End debut as a member of the chorus. An original cast recording was released by Decca Records.

Producer David Merrick, characteristically impressed by the low-cost project requiring minimal sets and costumes and a small cast, decided to stage the show in New York City. It was directed by Newley, and featured scenery and lighting design by Sean Kenny, musical supervision by Ian Fraser, musical direction by Milton Rosenstock, orchestrations by Ian Fraser. After one preview, the Broadway production opened on October 3, 1962, at the Shubert Theatre, eventually transferring to the Ambassador to complete its 555-performance run. Newley and Quayle reprised their London roles. Newley later was replaced by Kenneth Nelson, then Joel Grey; Joan Eastman assumed the roles of Evie et al.

A Broadway cast limited-run recording was originally released by RCA Victor Records. (The mainstream version was subsequently released by London Records.) On the national company tour, the show starred Grey and Julie Newmar.

A Broadway revival directed by Mel Shapiro opened on August 3, 1978, at the New York State Theater in Lincoln Center, where it ran for 30 performances. The cast included Sammy Davis Jr. and Marian Mercer. A revival cast recording was released by Warner Bros. Records.

A London revival, directed by Newley, opened on October 19, 1989, at the Lyric Theatre. Now starring Newley and Rhonda Burchmore, the show obtained a slight update, but it retained the Nazi-ish Fräulein, the Bolshevik Russian girl, and the Judy-Holliday-ditzy American blonde—all much more distant than in 1961 and thus outside the experience of anyone under 40. It received poor reviews and closed after just 52 performances over five weeks. Newley was very disappointed and bitter about the reviews, as he told the audience after the final curtain.

== Film adaptation ==
A 1966 Warner Bros. Pictures release was little more than a filmed version of a staged production. Directed by Philip Saville, it featured additional material by Alan and Marilyn Bergman, David Donable, and Al Ham. The cast included Tony Tanner and Millicent Martin. Neither a critical nor commercial success, it was nominated for an Academy Award for Best Adapted Music Scoring. The film deleted the German mistress sequence and substituted a Japanese mistress. Newley, Bricusse and Donable wrote the updated Japanese song. Al Ham and Marilyn and Alan Bergman wrote the finale "I Believed It All", which is not in the original stage version. In the film version, the show ends with "What Kind of Fool Am I?" There is no birth of a grandson, nor of Littlechap choosing to die in his stead and being reborn, as in the original musical play. With the exception of "Typische Deutsche," the original score is transferred complete.

Sammy Davis Jr. and Marian Mercer reprised their Broadway revival roles for Sammy Stops the World, a 1978 television adaptation taped at the Terrace Theater in Long Beach, California. It was theatrically released in a limited engagement in various American cities on September 21, 1979. As with the prior adaptation, this was neither a critical nor commercial success. Dennis Hunt of the Los Angeles Times said that "there are closeups and attempts at creative editing in this film but these elements aren't nearly enough to make it more than a statically filmed play"; he added that "this is a star vehicle but he can't really make it go. Davis, who can be an overpowering presence on stage, doesn't come across vividly and forcefully in this play-movie. It's not totally his fault. His efforts don't add up to much because he has no exceptional material to work with. Putting Davis in this production is like renting a cannon and filling it with blanks."

In 1996, a TV movie version was produced starring Peter Scolari as Littlechap and Stephanie Zimbalist as Evie. Made for the A&E Network, it adhered closely to the format of the original stage production.

== Songs ==
Act I

- The A.B.C. Song
- I Want to Be Rich
- Typically English
- A Special Announcement
- Lumbered
- Welcome to Sludgepool
- Gonna Build a Mountain
- Glorious Russian
- Malinki Malchik
- Family Fugue
- Typische Deutsche
- Nag! Nag! Nag!

Act II

- All-American
- Once in a Lifetime
- Mumbo Jumbo
- Welcome to Sunvale
- Life Is A Woman
- Someone Nice Like You
- What Kind of Fool Am I?

== Cast ==
Role	Original London production	Original Broadway production	1963 US national tour	1978 Broadway revival	1989 London revival
Littlechap	Anthony Newley	Anthony Newley	Joel Grey	Sammy Davis Jr.	Anthony Newley
Evie, Anya, Isle, Ginnie	Anna Quayle	Anna Quayle	Julie Newmar	Marian Mercer	Rhonda Burchmore
Jane (Littlechap's Daughter)	Jennifer Baker	Jennifer Baker	Janet Allman	Shelly Burch	
Susan (Littlechap's Daughter)	Susan Baker	Susan Baker	Jennifer Allman	Wendy Edmead	
Greek Chorus	Amanda Bayley; Barbara Halliwell; Gloria Johnson; Carole Keith; Virginia Mason; Vivienne St George; Marti Webb; Robert O'Leary	Rawley Bates; Bonnie Brody; Diana Corto; Jo-Anne Leeds; Karen Lynn Reed; Sylvia Tysick; Stephanie Winters; Mark Hunter; Paul Rufo	Mark Month; Michael Month; Karen Hopper; Karen Johnson; Sherry Lambert; Geri O’Gorman; Shelley Payton; Audrey Saxon; Beverlee Weir; Brooke Winsten	Dennis Daniels; Karen Giombetti; Patrick Kinser-Lau; Edwetta Little; Donna Lowe; Debora Materson; Joyce Nolen; Charles Willis Jr.	Fiona Alexandra; Dollie Henry; Julia Howson; Samantha Hughes; Kim Ismay; Victoria Lynson; Emma Priest; Wendy Schoemann; Martine Mccutcheon; Denis Outen; Chase Marks; Melissa Farmery; Laura Tristram; Rowan Logan

=== London replacements ===
Littlechap: Tony Tanner

Evie, Anya, Isle, Ginnie: Thelma Ruby

=== Broadway replacements ===
Littlechap: Joel Grey, Kenneth Nelson

=== Notable national tour replacements ===
Littlechap: Kenneth Nelson

== Awards and nominations ==
=== Original Broadway production ===
Year	Award	Category	Nominee	Result
1963	Tony Award	Best Musical		Nominated
1963	Tony Award	Best Author	Leslie Bricusse and Anthony Newley	Nominated
1963	Tony Award	Best Composer and Lyricist	Leslie Bricusse and Anthony Newley	Nominated
1963	Tony Award	Best Performance by a Leading Actor in a Musical	Anthony Newley	Nominated
1963	Tony Award	Best Performance by a Featured Actress in a Musical	Anna Quayle	Won
