= Joe Lynn (property master) =

American theatrical property master

Joe Lynn was an American theatrical Property master who worked primarily on Broadway. He is best known for creating the properties on the original Broadway productions such as Death of a Salesman and Cat on a Hot Tin Roof. He began his career in props in 1915.

== Awards ==
In 1950, Lynn received the Tony Award for Best Stage Technician for his work as the Master Propertyman on Miss Liberty. To date, he is the only propertyman to have won a Tony Award.

== Influence ==
In 1955, Ming Cho Lee was an unpaid assistant to Jo Mielziner. Cat on a Hot Tin Roof had a particularly tricky bar unit. Joe Lynn told him he would have to build it as they would never be able to find one to buy. Lee drew it so accurately that Lynn could build it directly from the drawing. Lynn told Mielziner, "This kid is OK. I can build from this drawing," which led to Lee's first paid job as a second assistant to Mielziner.

== Broadway productions ==
- 1936 Ethan Frome – National Theatre
- 1936 White Horse Inn – Center Theatre
- 1942 The Eve of St. Mark – Cort Theatre
- 1943 A New Life – Royale Theatre
- 1949 Death of Salesman – Morosco Theatre
- 1949 Miss Liberty – Imperial Theatre – Tony Award
- 1955 Cat on a Hot Tin Roof – Morosco Theatre
- 1961 Under the Yum-Yum Tree – Henry Miller's Theatre
- 1963 The Private Ear and The Public Eye – Morosco Theatre
