= Diane Sinclair =

American actress

Diane Sinclair (born Miriam Rosen; April 6, 1921 – May 14, 2011) was an American actress and dancer from 1939 through the 1950s.

== Early life ==
Born in Brooklyn, New York, Sinclair was the daughter of Max Rosen and Sylvia Morrison Rosen, who met as actors in amateur plays.

As a child, she performed on the Horn and Hardart Children's hour radio show and danced in shows at summer resorts in the Catskills.

== Career ==
Sinclair began her Broadway career at age 18 in 1939. She danced and acted in many Broadway shows and tours, including in The Tempest on tour (1945), credited as Diana Sinclair, and was featured with Gene Kelly in Pal Joey on Broadway (1940–41).

Her Broadway credits include Happy as Larry as Lachesis (1950); As the Girls Go as Ensemble and understudy to Miss Swenson (1948–50); Sons o' Fun as Little Nell and Ensemble (1941–43) and Too Many Girls (1939–40).

== Television ==
Sinclair became a regular on the TV variety shows of the 1950s, usually starring with longtime dance partner Ken Spaulding. She was a regular on The Dave Garroway Show from 1953 to 1954, and made a number of appearances on The Ed Sullivan Show. She also danced on the Jack Paar show. She and Spaulding formed a dance team on Paul Winchell's program. Life Magazine pictured her on its cover on January 25, 1954.

== Marriage ==
She met Sol Tepper, an orchestra musician, while performing in Billy Rose's Aquacade at the 1939 New York World's Fair. They married on July 28, 1942; the couple had one child, a son, Ronald Tepper (born July 29, 1943-died January 18, 2018).

== Later life ==
After retiring from performing, Sinclair had several successful careers, including casting for television, floral design, and as a travel agent. In her late 60s, she began doing portrait sculpture, both in-the-round and bas-relief, one of which hangs in the lobby of the Players' Club in Manhattan.

She died on May 14, 2011.
