= Solly Pernick =

American stage technician

- Born: Solomon Pernick; August 22, 1898; New York, New York, U.S.
- Died: March 8, 1990 (aged 91); Miami, Florida, U.S.
- Occupation: Stage technician
- Awards: Tony Award for Best Stage Technician (1963)

Solomon "Solly" Pernick (August 22, 1898 – March 8, 1990) was an American stage technician who worked in theater for over 65 years, starting in 1914 with Cecil Spooner. He won the Tony Award for Best Stage Technician in 1963 for his work on the musical Mr. President.

Pernick was business manager of the International Alliance of Theatrical Stage Employees Local One, a union for stagehands in New York City, for 14 years, and later served as its president.

In addition to Mr. President, Pernick worked on shows including Uncle Tom's Cabin, Ain't Misbehavin', and the Ziegfeld Follies.
