= Garroway at Large =

American musical variety show

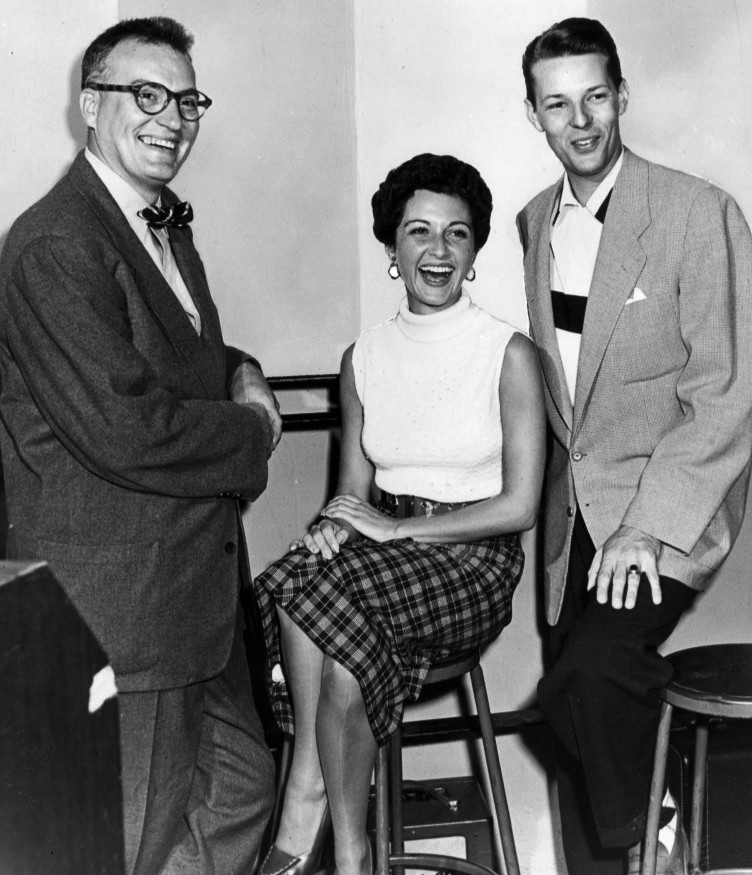
Garroway at WMAQ in 1951 with Connie Russell and Jack Haskell.

Garroway at Large was an experimental American musical variety show program with the host Dave Garroway in the Golden Age of Television. It was telecast at 10pm on Saturday (and later on Sundays and Fridays) on NBC from April 1949 to 1951. Garroway at Large aired with a full symphony orchestra conducted by Joseph Gallicchio. There were two female singers, Betty Chapel and Connie Russell and a male singer, Jack Haskell. In addition, the Hamilton Trio, a contemporary dance group, appeared each week, along with comedian Cliff Norton.

The show had only one local Chicago broadcast on April 8, 1949 before becoming an NBC Network program.

On February 19, 1950, Congoleum-Nairn became a sponsor of the show, which originated from WNBQ-TV in Chicago.

The series is notable for introducing an innovative presentation and staging to television. When television began in New York City, the shows adopted the familiar theatrical proscenium concept, separating the stage from the audience area. After World War II, several programs originated from Chicago, where Garroway was a disc jockey on radio station WMAQ.

When Garroway was assigned to host on television, he abandoned the usual conventions for a more casual approach in which the reality of the studio was acknowledged. Followed by a single camera, he walked around the entire large studio space and simple abstract sets as he talked to guests and the TV viewer directly. This live staging technique, known as the "Chicago Style", was developed further on Garroway's next show, Today.
