= Jack Haskell =

American singer

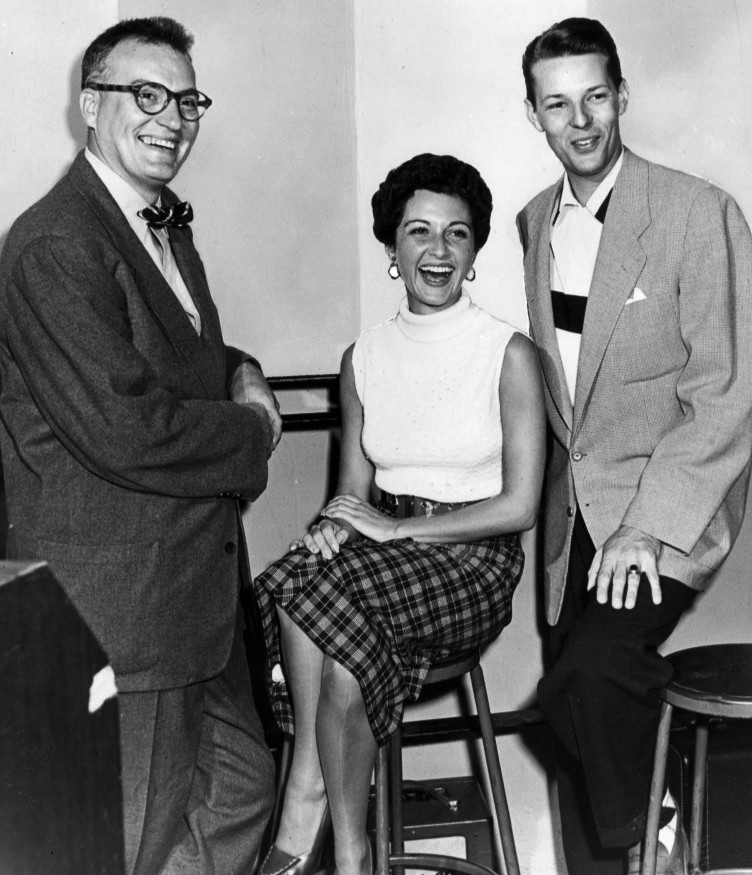
- Publicity photo of Dave Garroway, singer-actress Connie Russell and Jack Haskell from the WMAQ radio show, Dial Dave Garroway (1951)
- Born: John Thomas Haskell; April 30, 1919; Akron, Ohio
- Died: September 26, 1998 (aged 79); Englewood, New Jersey
- Education: Northwestern University
- Occupations: Singer, actor, announcer
- Spouse(s): Doris Lee Dahme Haskell, (died 1978), Helen Haskell
- Children: 1 son, Thomas Haskell

John Thomas Haskell (April 30, 1919 – September 26, 1998) was an American singer and announcer in the era of old-time radio and later in television.

== Early years ==
Haskell was born in Akron, Ohio and raised in Cleveland, Ohio. He majored in music at Northwestern University in Chicago, Illinois.

== Radio ==
While he was in college, Haskell sang on two Chicago stations, WBBM and WGN. and did commercials on The Fitch Bandwagon. Over the years, he was a regular on Varieties, The Jim Backus Show The Peter Lind Hayes Show, Stop the Music, and Music from the Heart of America.

Later in his career, he was one of the hosts for Monitor.

== Personal appearances ==
After finishing college, Haskell sang with Les Brown and his orchestra. Later in his career, he sang in supper clubs.

== Military service ==
During World War II, Haskell was initially a flight instructor at NAS Corpus Christi, Texas and later a Naval Air Transport Service pilot flying R5D transport planes extensively throughout the Pacific Theater for the United States Navy.

== Television ==
Haskell moved from Chicago to New York City to be with Dave Garroway on the first iteration of Today. He was also on The Ed Sullivan Show, The Mike Douglas Show, The Bell Telephone Hour, The Garry Moore Show, Garroway at Large, The Dave Garroway Show, The Jack Paar Show, Of All Things, Stop the Music, and The Tonight Show Starring Johnny Carson. He was the regular substitute announcer for Ed McMahon from 1964 to 1968.

== Stage ==
Haskell played Pat Gregory in the Broadway production of Mr. President. He was also active in summer stock theatre, including Gypsy in 1970.

== Recording ==
Recorded solo album, “Jack Swings for Jack (Paar) for the Strand label and the cover cast album of “Destry Rides Again” on RCA Camden, CAL 540. Haskell was the first vocalist signed by Thunderbird Record Company when it began in 1955. He was featured on the company's first recording, I Remember Mambo, backed with Who Can Say.

== Personal life ==
Haskell had a wife, Doris Lee Dahme Haskell, who he married while a US Naval Aviator and Flight Instructor at NAS Corpus Christi, Texas. They had a son Thomas. After Doris’ untimely death at age 57, he later married Helen.

After serving in the US Navy, Haskell was the co-owner in a cattle ranch is Cuero, Texas, only to later relocate to Chicago, Illinois to join early television pioneer, Dave Garroway, and the cast of the television show Garroway At Large.

Haskell was an avid off-shore racing sailor, and amateur photographer.

== Death ==
Haskell died September 26, 1998, at the Actors Fund Nursing Home in Englewood, New Jersey.

== Partial discography ==
- It Couldn't Be True - 1946, with Les Brown's Orchestra (Columbia 36977)
- In Love in Vain - 1946, with Les Brown's Orchestra (Columbia 36972)
- Years and Years Ago - 1946, with Les Brown's Orchestra (Columbia 37153)
- Beware My Heart - 1947, with Les Brown's Orchestra (Columbia 37235)
- When you Trim Your Christmas Tree - 1946, with Les Brown's Orchestra (Colombia 37174)

https://www.youtube.com/watch?v=yyXcaLg22x0
