= Loring Smith =

American actor

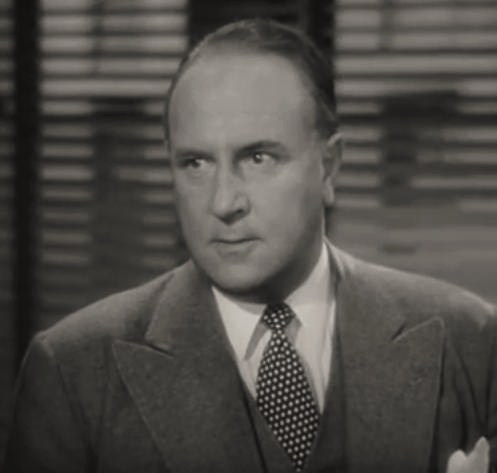
- Loring Smith in Shadow of the Thin Man.
- Born: November 18, 1890; Stratford, Connecticut, U.S.
- Died: July 8, 1981 (aged 90); Fairfield, Connecticut, U.S.
- Occupation: Actor
- Spouse: Natalie Sawyer

Loring B. Smith (November 18, 1890 – July 8, 1981) was an American vaudeville, stage, film, radio and television actor, frequently of broadly comic and gregarious characters. He enjoyed a 65-year career involved in many facets of the entertainment business.

== Early life ==
A native of Stratford, Connecticut, Smith left doubt as to the year of his birth. Most of the earliest sources list 1890, by the 1940s, it was 1895, and by the 1950s, the year became 1900. He does, however, have vaudeville and theatrical credits reaching back to the 1910s. While he served in the Tank Corps during World War I, he put on shows for soldiers. A booking agent saw him in a show at Camp Upton on Long Island, and that exposure led to his becoming a professional entertainer.

== Career ==
During the 1920s, 1930s and 1940s, he played hundreds of characters in radio drama, comedy and variety. He also intermittently appeared in films, playing supporting parts in 1941's Keep 'Em Flying, with Abbott and Costello and Shadow of the Thin Man, fourth in the William Powell–Myrna Loy series of Nick and Nora Charles mysteries. Over the following twenty-six years he was seen in nine others, including a cameo in Orson Welles' 1958 Touch of Evil as the driver of a car at a police check point, usually playing his patented persona of a blustery, equivocating businessman or politician.

At age 50, he became a Broadway actor, appearing in twelve productions between November 1940 and March 1964. In most of those, he was, as usual, billed as "Senator" or "Mayor". His Broadway debut came in Glamour Preferred (1940). While the majority of his assignments placed him in supporting roles, he was given a co-starring billing in the comedy Be Your Age, with Conrad Nagel. His most memorable Broadway role came nearly three years later when he portrayed Horace Vandergelder in Thornton Wilder's The Matchmaker.

Based primarily in New York, Smith frequently appeared on early television programs and was a regular on a live sitcom, The Hartmans, starring the married comic actors and dancers Paul and Grace Hartman, playing supposedly "themselves" as a suburban married couple, beset by various amusing tribulations, including an obnoxious brother-in-law, portrayed by Smith.

He also appeared on the West End stage in London, starring opposite Mary Martin in the original London production of Hello, Dolly!

Smith ended his acting career in the late 1960s, when he was in his late seventies. His final Broadway appearance was in his least successful production, Yves Jamiaque's A Murderer Among Us. Typically, Smith's role was a politician, the "Mayor". He appeared in two episodes of The Twilight Zone, "The Whole Truth" (January 20, 1961) and the hour-long "I Dream of Genie" (March 21, 1963), playing two more blustering politicians. In "The Whole Truth" he is "Honest Luther Grimbley", a city alderman ready to buy one of used car dealer's Jack Carson's less-than-adequate pieces of merchandise, intending to show his constituents that he is living up to his name by driving such an unprepossessing vehicle. His plans, however, immediately change when Carson, forced by the vehicle to tell the truth, confesses that the haunted Model A will have the veracity-enforcing effect on each of its subsequent owners.

His last acting role was a small part as, appropriately enough, a small-town Southern politician in Otto Preminger's 1967 film Hurry Sundown. He died fourteen years later in Fairfield, Connecticut, at the age of 90.

== Personal life ==
Smith was married to singer Natalie Sawyer, with whom he performed in vaudeville.

== Filmography ==
Year	Title	Role	Notes
1941	Keep 'Em Flying	Major Barstow	
1941	Shadow of the Thin Man	'Link' Stephens	
1947	Citizen Saint		
1948	Close-Up	Harry Avery	
1952	Pat and Mike	Mr. Beminger	
1953	The Clown	Benjamin Y. 'Goldie' Goldenson	
1953	Ma and Pa Kettle at Waikiki	Rodney Kettle	
1959	Happy Anniversary	Arthur Gans / Grandpa	
1963	The Cardinal	Cornelius J. Deegan	
1967	Hurry Sundown	Thomas Elwell	
