= Elaine Stritch at Liberty =

One-woman stage show

Elaine Stritch At Liberty
- Recording cover
- Music: Various
- Lyrics: Various
- Book: John Lahr and Elaine Stritch
- Basis: Life and career of Elaine Stritch
- Premiere: November 7, 2001: The Public Theater, New York
- Productions: 2001 Off-Broadway; 2002 Broadway
- Awards: 2002 Tony Award for Best Special Theatrical Event; 2002 Drama Desk Award for Outstanding Book of a Musical

Elaine Stritch at Liberty is an autobiographical one-woman show written by Elaine Stritch and John Lahr, and produced by George C. Wolfe, based on Stritch's personal anecdotes, as well as showtunes and Broadway standards that reflect her life both on and off the stage.

== Synopsis ==
The show consists of spoken monologues from Stritch following her life and career, interspersed with showtunes and pop standards that complement her stories. Stritch had previously sung many of the songs in major productions, such as "The Ladies Who Lunch" from Company and "Civilization" from Angel in the Wings, which she originated on Broadway. Her experiences and relationship with show business are focal points, while she also explores more intimate, personal themes like her alcoholism and romantic relationships.

== Productions ==
Originally directed and produced by George C. Wolfe at The Public Theater, the show premiered on November 7, 2001. After quickly selling out, the original engagement was extended twice: once until December 30 and then until January 6, 2002. The show then transferred to Broadway, opening on February 21, 2002 in the Neil Simon Theatre, closing on May 26 of that year.

Stritch continued to perform the show at regional and international venues.

== Reception ==
The Broadway production was recognized with the 2002 Tony Award for Best Special Theatrical Event and the 2002 Drama Desk Award for Outstanding Book of a Musical.

== Song list ==
Songs are listed alphabetically, as presented in the Broadway program, with the note "the following songs may or may not be performed."

- "All in Fun" (from Very Warm for May) — Jerome Kern and Oscar Hammerstein II
- "Broadway Baby"§ (from Follies) — Stephen Sondheim
- "But Not For Me" — George Gershwin and Ira Gershwin
- "If Love Were All" (from Bitter Sweet) — Noël Coward
- "Can You Use Any Money Today?"§ (from Call Me Madam) — Irving Berlin
- "Civilization"§ (from Angel in the Wings) — Carl Sigman and Bob Hilliard
- "Hooray for Hollywood" (from Hollywood Hotel) — Richard A. Whiting and Johnny Mercer
- "I'm Still Here" (from Follies) — Stephen Sondheim
- "I've Been to a Marvelous Party" — Noël Coward
- "I Want a Long Time Daddy" — Porter Grainger
- "The Little Things You Do Together"§ (from Company) — Stephen Sondheim
- "Something Good" (from The Sound of Music) — Richard Rodgers
- "The Ladies Who Lunch"§ (from Company) — Stephen Sondheim
- "The Party's Over" (from Bells Are Ringing — Styne, Comden, and Green
- "There Never Was a Baby Like My Baby" (from Two on the Aisle) — Styne, Comden, and Green
- "There's No Business Like Show Business" (from Annie Get Your Gun) — Irving Berlin
- "This Is All Very New to Me" (from Plain and Fancy) — Albert Hague and Arnold Horwitt
- "Why Do The Wrong People Travel?"§ (from Sail Away) — Noël Coward
- "Zip"§ (from Pal Joey) — Rodgers and Hart

Notes §: numbers previously performed by Stritch in professional productions

== Live album ==
A recording of the original off-Broadway production was released April 9, 2002 by DRG Records, containing both the musical numbers and selected spoken material from the show.

== Documentary film ==
The documentary adaptation directed by D. A. Pennebaker and Andy Picheta aired in 2004 on HBO, later winning two Emmy awards: Outstanding Variety Special and Individual Performance in a Variety or Music Program for Stritch. Stritch's exuberant acceptance speech—during which she danced up to the stage, uttered profanities, expressed gladness that her fellow nominees lost, reeled off a long list of comedic dedications, and declared that she would not leave until forcibly removed—has been described in retrospect as "something of an Emmy legend."

== Awards and nominations ==
=== 2002 Broadway production ===
Year	Award	Category	Nominee	Result	Ref.
2002	Tony Award	Best Special Theatrical Event		Won	
2002	Drama Desk Award	Outstanding Solo Performance	Elaine Stritch	Won	
2002	Drama Desk Award	Outstanding Book of a Musical	John Lahr and Elaine Stritch	Won	
2002	Drama Desk Award	Outstanding Director of a Musical	George C. Wolfe	Nominated	
2002	Drama Desk Award	Outstanding Orchestrations	Jonathan Tunick	Nominated	
2002	Outer Critics Circle Award	Outer Critics Circle Award for Outstanding Solo Performance	Elaine Stritch	Won	
2002	Drama League Award	Distinguished Achievement in Musical Theatre		Won	
2002	Lucille Lortel Award	Outstanding Lead Actress	Elaine Stritch	Nominated	
2002	New York Drama Critics' Circle Award	Special Citation		Hon.	
2002	Obie Award	Outstanding Performance	Elaine Stritch	Won	
2002	Obie Award	Special Citation		Hon.	

=== 2004 Documentary ===
Year	Award	Category	Nominee	Result	Ref.
2004	Primetime Emmy Award	Outstanding Variety, Music, or Comedy Special		Won	
2004	Primetime Emmy Award	Individual Performance in a Variety or Music Program	Elaine Stritch	Won	
2004	Primetime Emmy Award	Outstanding Directing for a Variety, Music or Comedy Program	Andy Picheta, Nick Doob, Chris Hegedus, and D. A. Pennebaker	Nominated	
