= 45 Fathers =

1937 film by James Tinling

- Theatrical release poster
- Directed by: James Tinling
- Screenplay by: Frances Hyland; Albert Ray
- Story by: Mary Bickell
- Produced by: John Stone
- Starring: Jane Withers; Thomas Beck; Louise Henry; Paul Hartman; Grace Hartman
- Cinematography: Harry Jackson
- Edited by: Alex Troffey
- Music by: Samuel Kaylin
- Production company: 20th Century Fox
- Distributed by: 20th Century Fox
- Release date: November 26, 1937
- Running time: 70 minutes
- Country: United States
- Language: English

45 Fathers is a 1937 American comedy film directed by James Tinling, written by Frances Hyland and Albert Ray, and starring Jane Withers, Thomas Beck, Louise Henry, Richard Carle, Nella Walker, and Andrew Tombes. It was released on November 26, 1937, by 20th Century Fox.

== Plot ==
A group of old men decides to adopt an orphan girl; once adopted, she dances, sings, and does whatever she can to help her new family.

== Cast ==
- Jane Withers as Judith Frazier
- Thomas Beck as Roger Farragut
- Louise Henry as Elizabeth Carter
- Paul Hartman as Joe McCoy
- Grace Hartman as Flo McCoy
- Richard Carle as Bunny Carothers
- Nella Walker as Mrs. Carter
- Andrew Tombes as Judge
- Leon Ames as Vincent
- Sammy Cohen as Prof. Ziska
- George Givot as Prof. Bellini
- Ruth Warren as Sarah
- Hattie McDaniel as Beulah
- Romaine Callender as Hastings
