= The Hartmans =

American television sitcom (1949)

- Also known as: The Hartmans (at Home)
- Genre: Sitcom
- Starring: Paul Hartman; Grace Hartman
- Country of origin: United States
- Original language: English
- No. of seasons: 1

Production
- Camera setup: Multi-camera
- Running time: 25 mins.

Original release
- Network: NBC
- Release: February 27 – May 22, 1949

The Hartmans (also known as The Hartmans (at Home)) is an American television sitcom that aired live on NBC on Sunday nights from February 27 to May 22, 1949. The series stars Paul and Grace Hartman, a married couple who performed together on the vaudeville circuit and on the Broadway stage.

== Plot ==
The series centers around a young married couple who live in Forest Heights, New York.

== Cast ==
- Paul Hartman....Himself
- Grace Hartman....Herself
- Harold J. Stone....The handyman
- Loring Smith.....Their brother-in-law
- Robert Shawley....Their nephew
- Gage Clark.....The man next door
- Valerie Cossart....Grace's sister

== Production notes ==
The Hartmans were given their own television series shortly after they won Tony Awards for the Broadway revue Angel in the Wings (Paul won for Best Actor while Grace won for Best Actress in a Musical. NBC had hoped to cash in on the couple's popularity following their respective Tony Award wins but the series failed to catch on and was canceled by NBC nearly two months later.

Harry Herrmann was the show's producer, with Ted Luce (the Hartmans' son) and Frank Wilson as writers. Textron was the sponsor. The show originated from WNBT on Sundays from 7:30 to 8 p.m. Eastern Time.

== Critical response ==
A review in The New York Times of the program's premiere episode said that the show was "rather obviously patterned on radio's Fibber McGee and Molly. Jay Gould wrote that the direction and the script were weak and the main characters lacked detail.

In the trade publication Variety, a review of the same episode said "the program dragged too much in spots and the fault obviously lay with the script." It added that better writing and improved production should help the program to "settle down into a welcome Sunday night offering." Another flaw cited was the limited use of closeups of the Hartmans' expressive faces, as cameras were used more to show aspects of the show's multi-room set.
