= Tickets, Please! =

Tickets, Please! is a musical revue. It contains sketches by Sketches by Harry Herrmann, Edmund Rice, Jack Roche and Ted Luce, with music and lyrics by Lyn Duddy, Joan Edwards, Mel Tolkin, Lucille Kallen and Clay Warnick. Incidental music is by Phil Ingalls and Harold Hastings.

It first played on Broadway at the Coronet Theatre from April 27, 1950 to November 4, 1950. It then moved to the Mark Hellinger Theatre for a further three weeks, closing on November 27, 1950, for a total of 245 performances. The production was directed by Mervyn Nelson and choreographed by Joan Mann. It starred Grace Hartman and Paul Hartman and featured Jack Albertson, Roger Price and Tommy Wonder. It is also notable as the first Broadway credit of Larry Kert and Hal Prince (assistant stage manager). Time magazine wrote that the piece "is that always attractive idea, an intimate revue. Its stars are those always entertaining zanies, the Hartmans, who are in excellent form. The pity is that the rest of the show constitutes a sort of conspiracy against them."
