= Civilization (Bob Hilliard and Carl Sigman song) =

1947 song by Bob Hilliard and Carl Sigman

"Civilization" is an American traditional pop song. It was written by Bob Hilliard and Carl Sigman, published in 1947 and later included in the 1947 Broadway musical Angel in the Wings, sung by Elaine Stritch. The song is sometimes also known as "Bongo, Bongo, Bongo (I Don't Want to Leave the Congo)", from the first line of its chorus. The sheet music gives the title as "Civilization (Bongo, Bongo, Bongo)".

== Content ==
The song is a satire of modern society sung from the perspective of a Congolese man. The man has heard from missionaries that "civilization is fine", but he remains unconvinced: civilized people spend their lives working in cramped and noisy cities and have to deal with such annoyances as landlords, doorbells, and automobile accidents. Whenever they get time off, they rush to vacation spots to swim and fish, but the tribesman's lifestyle allows him to do this all year. Bringing up the atom bomb, he refuses to argue any further and concludes that it would be better to stay in the jungles of the Congo, where no modern "conveniences" will bother him.

== Recordings ==
At least five recorded versions made the Billboard charts: by The Andrews Sisters and Danny Kaye, by Louis Prima, by "Smilin'" Jack Smith, by Ray McKinley, and by Woody Herman.

The Andrews Sisters and Danny Kaye recording was made September 27, 1947, and released by Decca Records as catalog number 23940. The record first reached the Billboard magazine charts on November 14, 1947, and lasted 10 weeks on the chart, peaking at No. 3. The Louis Prima recording made July 24, 1947, RCA Victor Records catalog number 20-2400, first reached the Billboard magazine charts on November 7, 1947, and lasted eight weeks, peaking at No. 8. The Jack Smith recording released by Capitol Records as catalog number 465 reached the Billboard magazine charts on December 26, 1947, and lasted two weeks on the chart, peaking at No. 14. The Ray McKinley recording, Majestic Records catalog number 7274, first reached the Billboard charts on December 26, 1947, at No. 14, lasting one week. The Woody Herman recording, Columbia Records catalog number 37885, reached the Billboard magazine charts the same week at No. 15, also lasting one week.

== 1947 charting versions ==
Recording artist	Recording date	Label and cat. no.	Entered Billboard chart	Peak position	Weeks on chart
Louis Prima	July 24, 1947	RCA Victor 20-2400	November 7, 1947	8	8
The Andrews Sisters and Danny Kaye	September 27, 1947	Decca 23940	November 14, 1947	3	10
Jack Smith		Capitol 465	December 26, 1947	14	2
Ray McKinley		Majestic 7274	December 26, 1947	14	1
Woody Herman		Columbia 37885	December 26, 1947	15	1

Note that all five versions were on the chart during the week of December 26, 1947.

== Other versions ==
A recording by Joe Loss and his Orchestra with vocal by Elizabeth Batey was made in London on March 11, 1948. It was released by EMI on the His Master's Voice label BD 6007. Dyan Cannon performed the song on The Muppet Show along with several Muppet jungle animals. Although Elaine Stritch sang it on Broadway, she did not record it until the 1977 album Make Mine Manhattan: Great Revues Revisited. It was included in her 2002 one woman stage show Elaine Stritch at Liberty. In 1967, a version of the song was included on Disneyland Records "Songs From 'The Jungle Book' And Other Jungle Favorites" (STER1304).

The song was translated into Finnish titled as "Bingo bango bongo" by Tapio Lahtinen. It was recorded by both Henry Theel and Olavi Virta in 1948. Lasse Mårtenson (1963), Hullujussi (1974), How Many Sisters (1983), and Lissun Baari (1997) have also released their versions in Finnish.

The song was also translated into Spanish by Artur Kaps and performed by vocal quarter Los Bingsters in Spain in 1949 under the title "Civilización: La canción del Bongo Bongo Bongo", and released on Columbia label in a shellac with a version of "The Woody Woodpecker Song" on the other side.

An Italian version translated by Alberto Curci was made popular in Italy, sung by Nilla Pizzi and Luciano Benevene in 1947, and also sung by Sophia Loren in the 1954 movie Too Bad She's Bad. It was again brought to popularity in 1985 when Renzo Arbore used it in a popular TV show (Quelli della notte), and as a single release by comedy actor Christian De Sica in 1994.

The song was translated into German by Carl-Ulrich Blecher and set to music by Bully Buhlan in 1949 under the title "Bongo Bongo Bongo". In the 1950s, the band Die 3 Travellers and jazz musician Horst Winter each adapted the song. A version by the boy band Ulrich Tukur & Die Rhythmus Boys followed in 2001.

== Other appearances ==
- The 1950 Screen Songs animated short Jingle Jangle Jungle features a lion inviting the audience to sing along to the song to explain why he doesn't want to join a circus.
- "Civilization", performed by Danny Kaye and the Andrews Sisters, is featured on the in-game Galaxy News Radio in the 2008 video game Fallout 3, which takes place in a post-apocalyptic, retro-futurist United States in the year 2277 in the ruins of Washington D.C. The song is also included on Diamond City Radio in Fallout 4, the fifth major installment of the Fallout series, which takes place in the post-apocalyptic ruins of Boston in the year 2287, as well as in Fallout 76 on Appalachia Radio. Several characters note the irony of the song as most civilization has collapsed after nuclear war.
- Louis Prima's recording of "Civilization" is heard playing on the radio in Adrian Lyne's 1997 film Lolita.
- Sofia Loren lilts the song several times in Alessandro Blasetti's 1955 film Too Bad She's Bad
- In Terence Davies's 1992 film The Long Day Closes, a man sings the song
