= Elaine Stritch =

American actress (1925–2014)

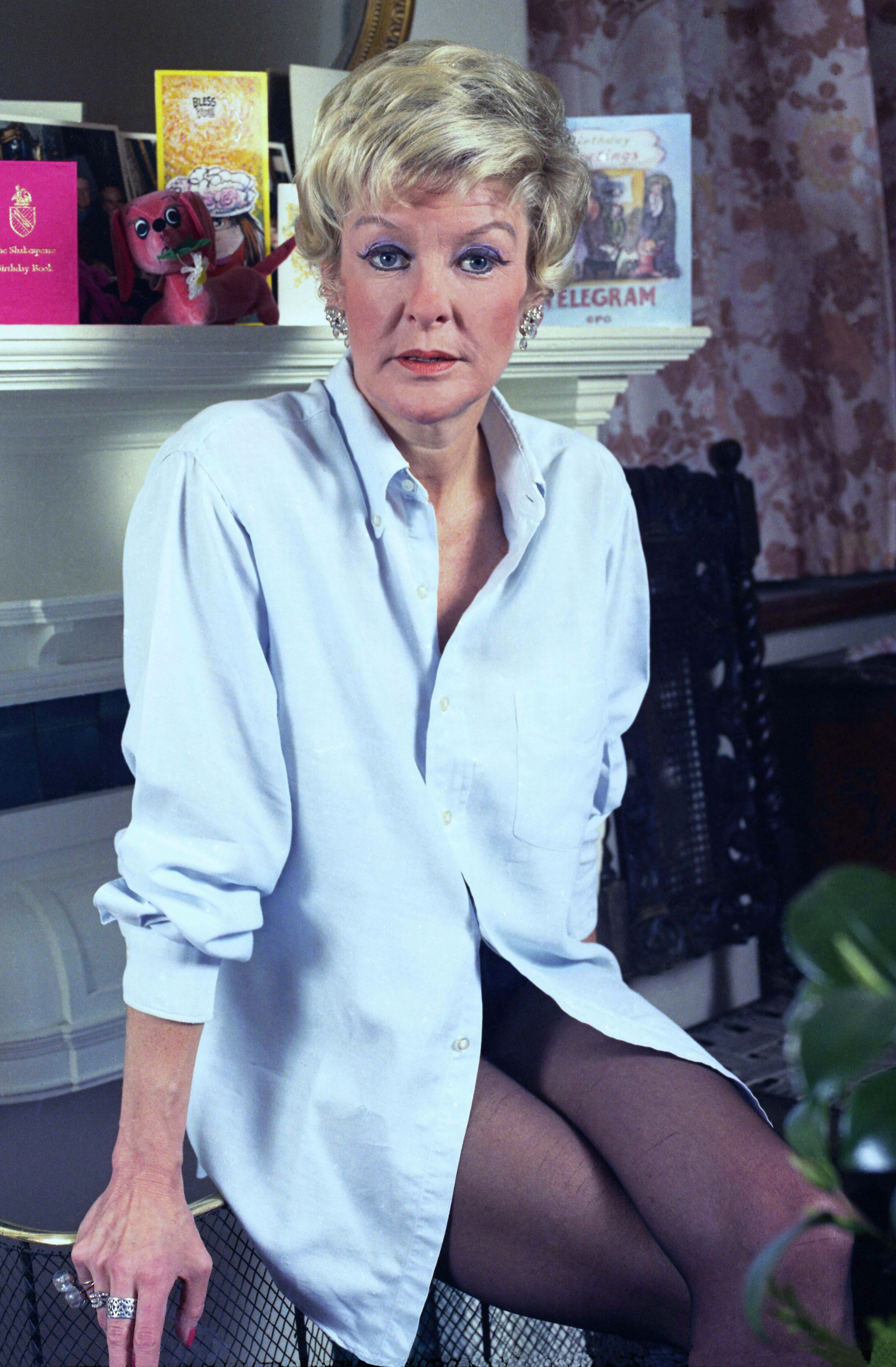
- Portrait by Allan Warren, 1973
- Born: February 2, 1925; Detroit, Michigan, U.S.
- Died: July 17, 2014 (aged 89); Birmingham, Michigan, U.S.
- Resting place: Memorial Park Cemetery, Skokie, Illinois
- Occupations: Actress; singer; comedienne
- Years active: 1944–2014
- Spouse: John Bay (m. 1973; died 1982)

Elaine Stritch (February 2, 1925 – July 17, 2014) was an American actress, singer, and comedian, known for her work on Broadway and later, television. She made her professional stage debut in 1944 and appeared in numerous stage plays, musicals, feature films and television series. Stritch was inducted into the American Theater Hall of Fame in 1995.

Stritch made her Broadway debut in the 1946 comedy Loco. She went on to receive four Tony Award nominations for the William Inge play Bus Stop (1956), the Noël Coward musical Sail Away (1961), the Stephen Sondheim musical Company (1970) (which included her performance of the song "The Ladies Who Lunch"), and for the revival of the Edward Albee play A Delicate Balance (1996). Her fifth nomination was for her one-woman show Elaine Stritch at Liberty, which won the 2002 Tony Award for Best Special Theatrical Event.

Stritch relocated to London in the 1970s and starred in several West End productions, including Tennessee Williams' Small Craft Warnings (1973) and Neil Simon's The Gingerbread Lady (1974). She also starred with Donald Sinden in the ITV sitcom Two's Company (1975–79), which earned her a 1979 BAFTA TV Award nomination. She won an Emmy Award in 1993 for her guest role on Law & Order and another for the 2004 television documentary of her one-woman show Elaine Stritch at Liberty. From 2007 to 2012, she had a recurring role as Colleen Donaghy on the NBC sitcom 30 Rock, a role that won her a third Emmy in 2007.

== Early life ==
Stritch was born on February 2, 1925, in Detroit, Michigan, the youngest daughter of Mildred (née Jobe), a homemaker, and George Joseph Stritch, an executive with B.F. Goodrich. She had two older sisters, Georgene and Sally. Her Catholic family was well-off. Her father was of Irish descent, while her mother had Welsh ancestry. Cardinal Samuel Stritch, Archbishop of Chicago from 1940 to 1958, was one of her cousins. She trained at the Dramatic Workshop of The New School for Social Research in New York City under Erwin Piscator, alongside Marlon Brando, Bea Arthur, and Harry Belafonte.

== Career ==
=== Early stage career ===
Stritch made her stage debut in 1944. Her later Broadway debut was in Loco in 1946, directed by Jed Harris, followed soon after by Made in Heaven (as a replacement), and then Angel in the Wings (1947), a revue in which she performed comedy sketches and the song "Civilization".

Stritch understudied Ethel Merman for Call Me Madam, and, at the same time, appeared in the 1952 revival of Pal Joey, singing "Zip". Stritch later starred in the national tour of Call Me Madam, and appeared in a supporting role in the original Broadway production of William Inge's play Bus Stop. In 1958 she originated the leading role of Maggie Harris in the musical Goldilocks.

She starred in Noël Coward's Sail Away on Broadway in 1961. Stritch started in the show in a "relatively minor role and was only promoted over the title and given virtually all the best songs when it was reckoned that the leading lady...although excellent, was rather too operatic for a musical comedy". During out-of-town tryouts in Boston, Coward was "unsure about the dramatic talents" of one of the leads, opera singer Jean Fenn.

They were, after all, engaged for their voices and...it is madness to expect two singers to play subtle 'Noël Coward' love scenes with the right values and sing at the same time.

Joe Layton suggested "What would happen if...we just eliminated [Fenn's] role and gave everything to Stritch? The show was very old-fashioned, and the thing that was working was Elaine Stritch. Every time she went on stage [she] was a sensation." The reconstructed 'Sail Away' opened on Broadway at the Broadhurst Theatre on October 3, 1961", with Stritch giving what Howard Taubman of The New York Times said "must be the performance of her career."

In 1966, she played Ruth Sherwood in the musical Wonderful Town at New York's City Center, and appeared in an Off Broadway revival of Private Lives in 1968.

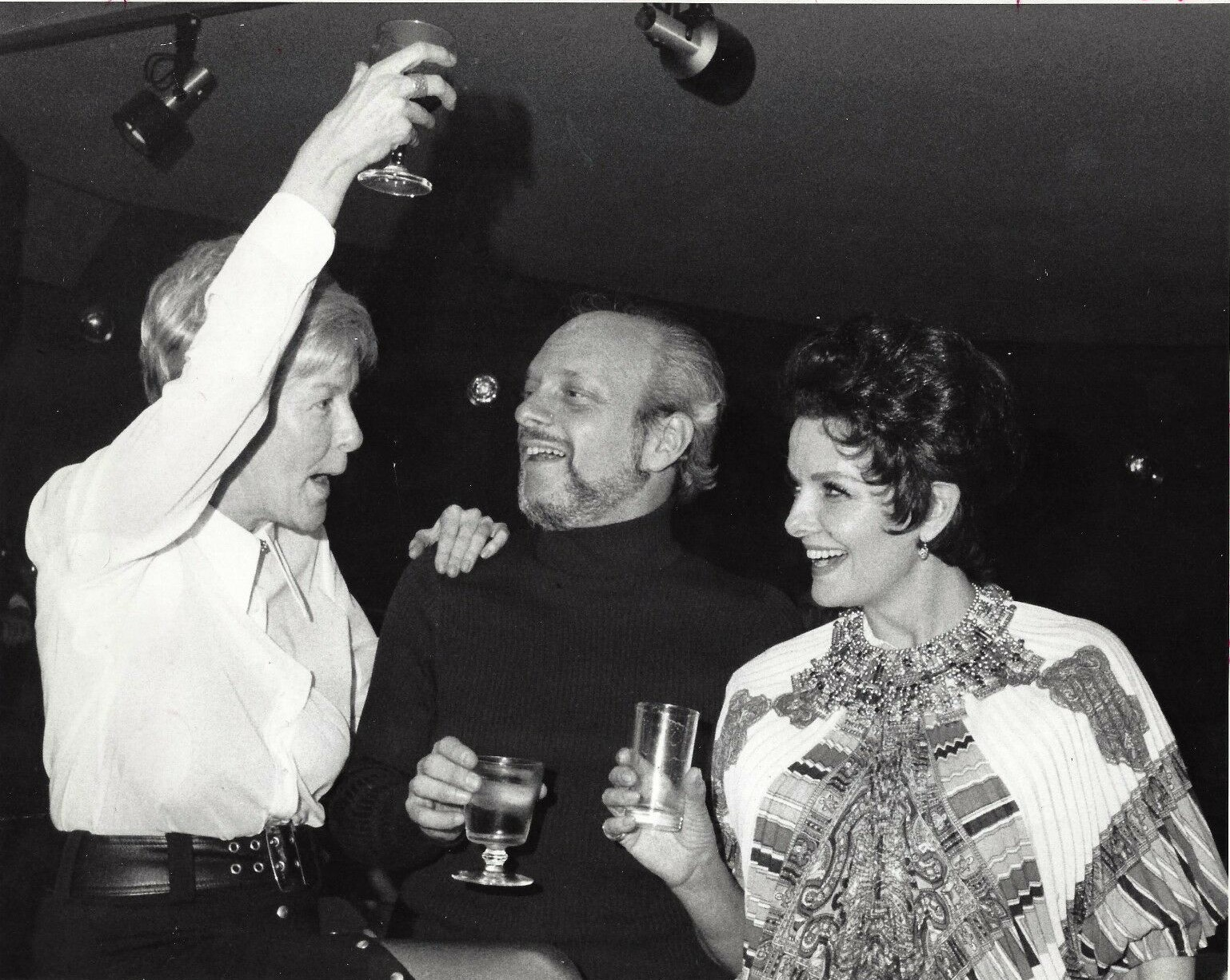
Elaine Stritch, Harold Prince, and Jane Russell, on the set of the Broadway musical, Company (1970–72)

She was the original performer cast in the role of Joanne in Stephen Sondheim's Company (1970) on Broadway. After over a decade of successful runs in shows in New York, Stritch moved in 1972 to London, where she starred in the West End production of Company. On tour and in stock, Stritch appeared in such musicals as No, No, Nanette, The King and I, I Married an Angel, and in Mame as both Vera Charles (opposite Janet Blair) and Mame Dennis.

=== Television ===
Stritch's earliest television appearances were in The Growing Paynes (1949) and the Goodyear Television Playhouse (1953–55). She also appeared on episodes of The Ed Sullivan Show in 1954. She was the first and original Trixie Norton in a Honeymooners sketch with Jackie Gleason, Art Carney and Pert Kelton. The character was originally a burlesque dancer, but the role was rewritten and recast after just one episode with the more wholesome looking Joyce Randolph playing the character as a housewife.

Stritch's other television credits included a number of dramatic programs in the 1950s and 1960s, including Studio One. In the 1960–1961 television season, Stritch appeared in the role of writer Ruth Sherwood in the CBS sitcom My Sister Eileen, opposite Shirley Bonne as her younger sister, Eileen Sherwood, an aspiring actress. The sisters, natives of Ohio, live in a brownstone apartment in Greenwich Village. The one-season series aired opposite Hawaiian Eye on ABC and Perry Como's Kraft Music Hall on NBC.

She also co-starred in The Trials of O'Brien with Peter Falk and Joanna Barnes. The series ran for 22 episodes on CBS Television between September 18, 1965 and March 18, 1966.

In 1975, Stritch starred in the British LWT comedy series Two's Company opposite Donald Sinden. She played Dorothy McNab, an American writer living in London who was known for her lurid and sensationalist thriller novels. Sinden played Robert, her English butler, who disapproved of practically everything Dorothy did and the series derived its comedy from the inevitable culture clash between Robert's very British stiff-upper-lip attitude and Dorothy's devil-may-care New York view of life. Two's Company was exceptionally well received in Britain and ran for four series, concluding in 1979. In 1979, both Stritch and Sinden were nominated for a BAFTA TV Award for Two's Company, in the category "Best Light Entertainment Performance", losing out to Ronnie Barker.

In 1980, Stritch starred in another series for LWT, Nobody's Perfect (the British version of Maude—not to be confused with the 1980 American series of the same name, which aired in the UK as Hart of the Yard) playing Bill Hooper alongside Richard Griffiths as her husband Sam. Unsatisfied with the Anglicised scripts, Stritch herself adapted the original American scripts for all but one of the fourteen episodes (Griffiths handled the remaining one).

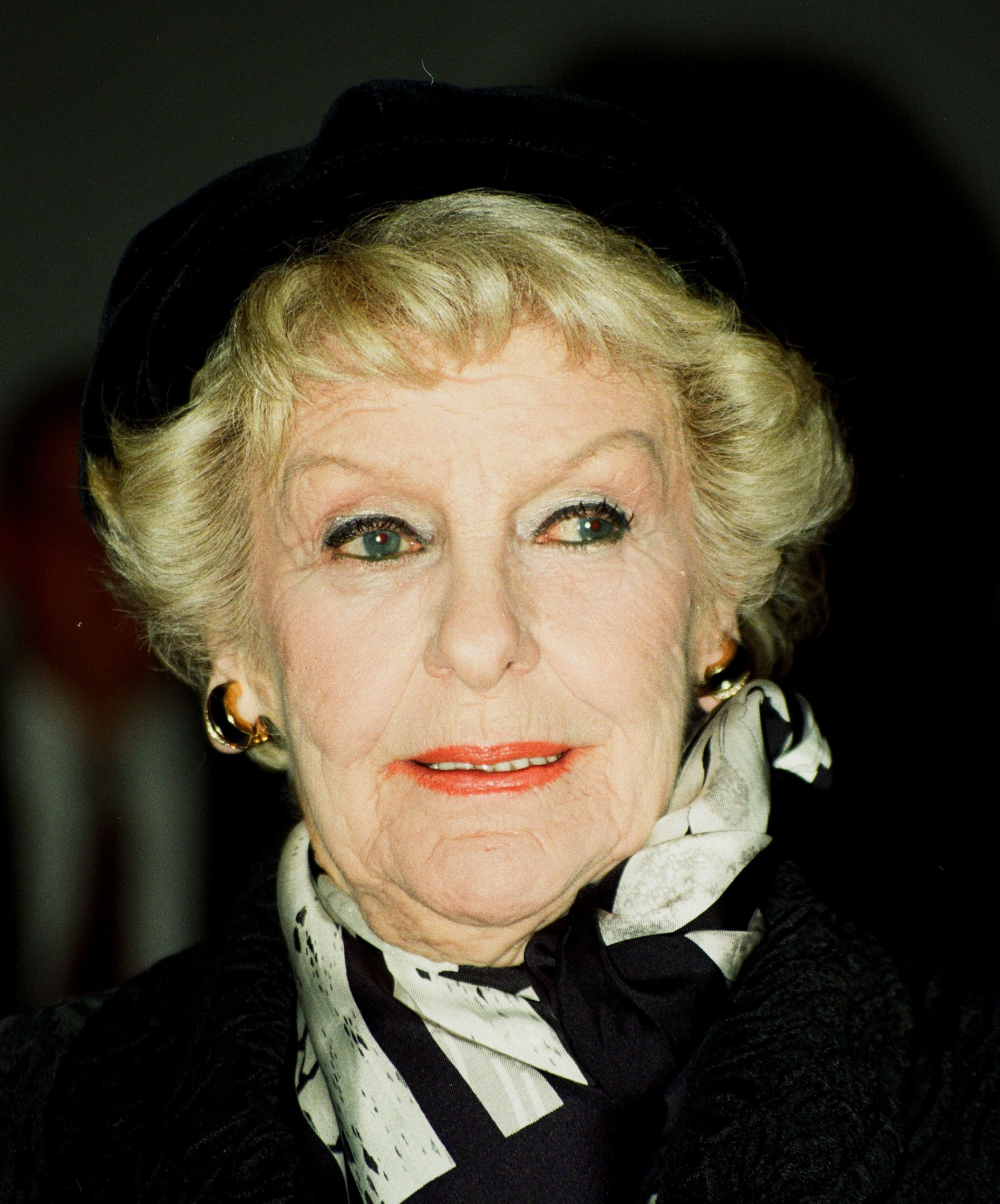
Stritch in 1996

Other British television appearances by Stritch included Roald Dahl's Tales of the Unexpected. Although she appeared several times in different roles, perhaps her most memorable appearance was in the story "William and Mary", in which she played the wife of a man who has cheated death by having his brain preserved. She appeared on BBC 1's children's series, Jackanory, reading, among other stories, Charlie and the Chocolate Factory by Roald Dahl.

After returning to the United States, she appeared on The Edge of Night as vinegary nanny Mrs. DeGroot, then was cast as a regular on the short-lived The Ellen Burstyn Show in 1986. She appeared as the stern schoolteacher Mrs. McGee on three episodes of The Cosby Show (1989–90). She had a recurring role in Law & Order (1992, 1997) as Lanie Stieglitz. Other roles included Judge Grace Lema on Oz (1998); and Martha Albright (mother of Jane Curtin's character) on two episodes of 3rd Rock From the Sun (1997, 2001), alongside her Broadway co-star George Grizzard, who played George Albright. On April 26, 2007, she began guest appearances on the NBC sitcom 30 Rock as Colleen, the fearsome mother of Alec Baldwin's lead character, Jack Donaghy.

Stritch was reportedly considered for the role of Dorothy Zbornak on The Golden Girls but, as she related in her show Elaine Stritch at Liberty, she "blew her audition". The role was cast with Beatrice Arthur. She was seen on One Life to Live (1993), replacing fellow stage legend Eileen Heckart as Wilma Bern. In 1996, she appeared on an episode of Late Show with David Letterman as a woman who believes host David Letterman is her pool boy.

=== Film roles ===
Stritch appeared in more films in her later years than the early part of her career. In an interview in 1988, it was noted that "Making movies is challenging to Stritch since she considers herself a novice." She said: "I'm fascinated with it. And I want to do more of them." She was asked why she waited so long to make movies since she apparently enjoys it so much. "You do a movie for, like, three months and then you're finished. You do a part in a play and it's like going into a roomful of audiences for a year."

Early in her career, she appeared in Three Violent People (1956) starring Charlton Heston, as the hotel proprietor pal of Anne Baxter, and then co-starred opposite Rock Hudson and Jennifer Jones in the David O. Selznick remake of A Farewell to Arms (1957) as Hudson's nurse. In The Perfect Furlough, she co-starred opposite Tony Curtis and Janet Leigh. She had a showy role as the lesbian proprietor of a bar in the cult film Who Killed Teddy Bear? (1965), which starred Sal Mineo. She played a "tough-as-nails" nurse in the remake of The Spiral Staircase (1975) and was praised for her performance in Providence (1977).

When she returned to the United States in the mid-1980s from London, Woody Allen cast her as the former movie star mother in his drama September (1987). People magazine called her performance "acclaimed" and wrote "Though the movie has received mixed reviews, Stritch's roaring presence, like Godzilla in a stalled elevator, can't be ignored." Allen later cast her in his comedy Small Time Crooks (2000) in which she played a "snobby socialite". Rex Reed wrote of her performance: "Elaine Stritch can still stop you in your tracks with a meaningless, drop-dead one-liner (which is all she gets here)."

She joined the ensemble of Cocoon: The Return (1988) as an apartment manager who helps widowed Jack Gilford get over his wife's death. Among her co-stars were former Goldilocks co-star Don Ameche and Gwen Verdon. She appeared in Out to Sea (1997) as Dyan Cannon's wise-cracking mother and "danced up a storm" with the other characters. She played Winona Ryder's loving grandmother in the film Autumn in New York (2000).

Stritch had a rare co-starring role in the comedy Screwed (2000), playing Miss Crock, who becomes the intended victim of a kidnapping by her disgruntled butler (Norm Macdonald). She appeared in the comedy Monster in Law (2005) starring Jennifer Lopez and Jane Fonda, playing Fonda's former mother-in-law .

=== BBC Radio ===
In 1982, Stritch appeared on an edition of the long-running BBC Radio comedy series Just a Minute alongside Kenneth Williams, Clement Freud and Barry Cryer. The show was described by long-time chairman Nicholas Parsons as being among the most memorable because of the way Stritch stretched the show's rules. She described Kenneth Williams as capable of making "one word into a three-act play".

=== Later stage work ===
After her husband, John Bay, died from brain cancer in 1982, Stritch returned to America, and after a further lull in her career and struggles with alcoholism, Stritch began performing again. She appeared in a one-night only concert of Company in 1993 and as Parthy in a Broadway revival of the musical Show Boat in 1994.

In 1996 she played Claire in a revival of Edward Albee's A Delicate Balance, with Variety writing: "Equally marvelous is Stritch, with a meatier role than her recent foray as Parthy in 'Show Boat.' To watch her succumb to the vast amounts of alcohol Claire ingests, folding and refolding her legs, slipping – no, oozing – onto the floor, her face crumpling like a paper bag, is to witness a different but equally winning kind of thespian expertise. It's a master class up there."

==== Elaine Stritch at Liberty ====
Her one-woman show Elaine Stritch at Liberty, a summation of her life and career, premiered at New York's Public Theater, running from November 7 to December 30, 2001. It then ran on Broadway at the Neil Simon Theatre from February 21 to May 27, 2002, and then, also in 2002, at London's Old Vic Theatre. Newsweek noted:

Now we see how At Liberty, the amazing one-woman show Stritch is moving to Broadway from the Public Theater this week, acquired the credit, "Constructed by John Lahr. Reconstructed by Elaine Stritch". "The reconstruction means I had the last say", she says. "Damn right I did." ... In case you didn't notice, Stritch is not the kind of woman who goes in for the sappy self-indulgence that pollutes most one-person shows. In fact, At Liberty is in a class by itself, a biting, hilarious and even touching tour-de-force tour of Stritch's career and life. Almost every nook and cranny of "At Liberty" holds a surprise. Turns out she dated Marlon Brando, Gig Young and Ben Gazzara, though she dropped Ben when Rock Hudson showed an interest in her. "And we all know what a bum decision that turned out to be", she says. And then there were the shows. A British writer recently called Stritch "Broadway's last first lady", and when you see her performing her signature numbers from Company and Pal Joey and hear her tell tales of working with Merman, Coward, Gloria Swanson and the rest, it's hard to argue. Especially since she does it all dressed in a long white shirt and form-fitting black tights. It's both a metaphor for her soul-baring musical and a sartorial kiss-my-rear gesture to anyone who thinks there isn't some life left in the 76-year-old diva. "Somebody said to me the other day, 'Is this the last thing you're going to do?'", says Stritch. "In your dreams! I can't wait to get back into an Yves Saint Laurent costume that isn't mine – but [that] will be when the show is over.

— Peyser, Marc, Newsweek

==== A Little Night Music ====
Stritch appeared in the Broadway revival of the Sondheim-Wheeler musical A Little Night Music from July 2010 to January 2011, succeeding Angela Lansbury in the role of Madame Armfeldt, the mother who remembers her life as a courtesan in the song "Liaisons". The AP reviewer of the musical (with the two new leads) wrote "Devotees of Stritch, who earned her Sondheim stripes singing, memorably, 'The Ladies Who Lunch' in Company 40 years ago, will revel in how the actress, who earned a huge ovation before her first line at a recent preview, brings her famously salty, acerbic style to the role of Madame Armfeldt."

The theatre critic for The Toronto Star wrote:

Stritch offers a sophisticated gloss on her by now patented, plain-talking woman who reveals all the home truths everyone ever wanted (or didn't) to hear about themselves. When Stritch tears into her big set-piece, 'Liaisons', about all the affairs in her life, it's not just a witty catalogue of indiscretions but a deeply moving fast-forward through a life filled equally with love, loss, joy and regret.

=== Cabaret ===
Stritch performed a cabaret act in New York City at the Cafe Carlyle in the Carlyle Hotel, where she was a resident from 2005 until she left New York in 2013. Her first show at the Carlyle was titled "At Home at the Carlyle". The New York Times reviewer wrote:

Amazingly, none of the 16 songs she performs have ever been in her repertory, and just as amazingly, you don't miss signature numbers... [L]etting them go has allowed her to venture into more sensitive emotional territory. Interpreting stark, talk-sing versions of Rodgers and Hart's "He Was Too Good to Me", "Fifty Percent" from the musical Ballroom, and Kurt Weill and Ogden Nash's "That's Him", she comes into her own as a dramatic ballad singer.

Between musical numbers, Stritch told stories from the world of stage and screen, tales from her everyday life and personal glimpses of her private tragedies and triumphs. She performed at the Cafe Carlyle in early 2010 and in fall 2011 in At Home at the Carlyle: Elaine Stritch Singin' Sondheim...One Song at a Time.

== Personal life ==
Stritch was married to the actor John Bay from 1973 until his death in 1982. He was part of the family that owns the Bay's English Muffins company, and Stritch sent English muffins as gifts to friends. Said John Kenley: "Every Christmas, she still sends me English muffins."

When she was based in London, Stritch and her husband lived at the Savoy Hotel.

She was good friends with gossip columnist Liz Smith, with whom she shared a birthday (February 2).

In March 2013, Stritch announced she was leaving New York and relocating to Birmingham, Michigan, close to where she grew up.

Stritch was candid about her alcoholism. She took her first drink at 14 and began using it as a crutch before performances to vanquish her stage fright and insecurities. Her drinking worsened after Bay's death, and she sought help after experiencing problems with the effects of alcoholism, including the onset of diabetes. Elaine Stritch at Liberty discusses the topic at length.

== Death ==
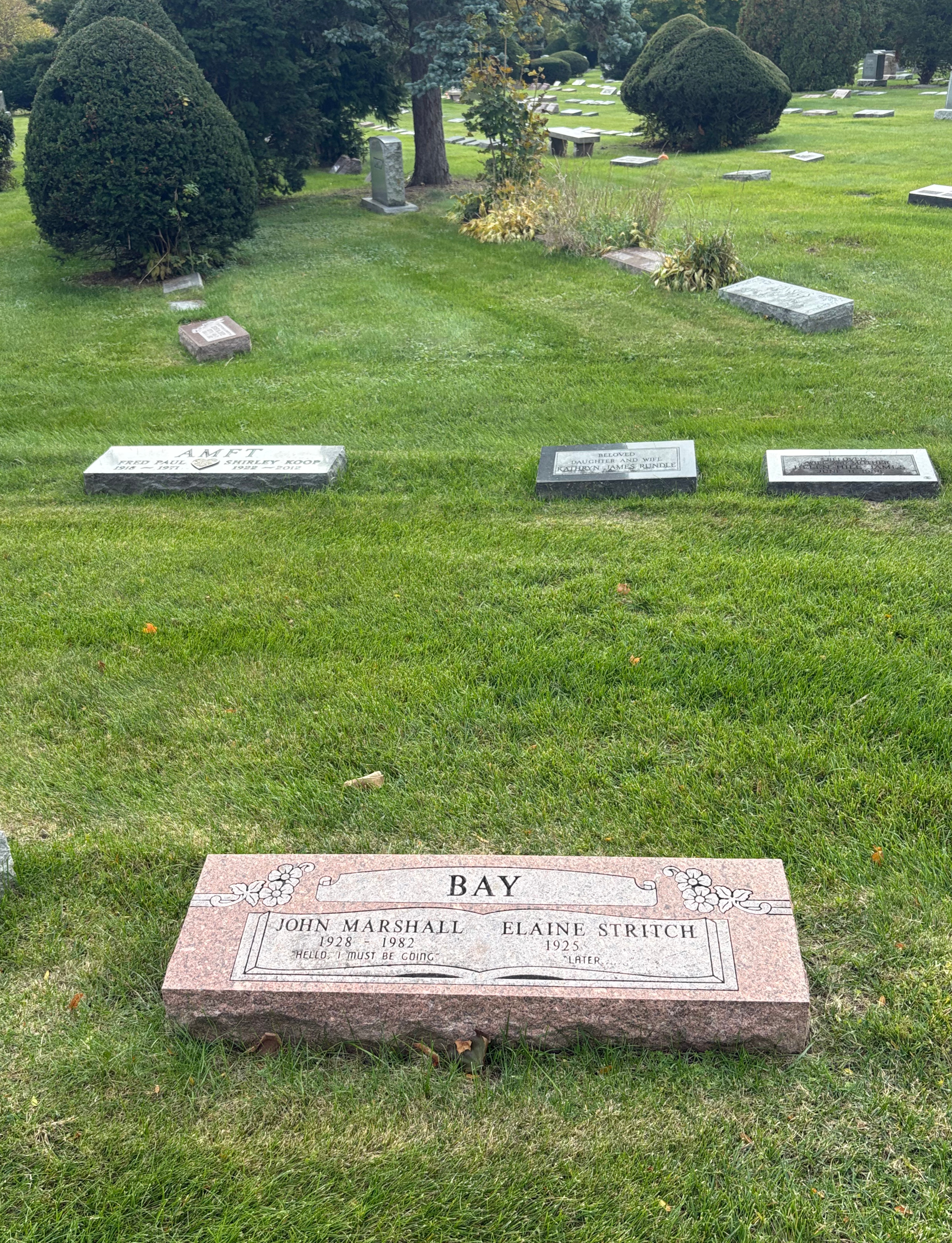
Stritch's grave at Memorial Park Cemetery

Stritch died in her sleep at age 89 at her home in Birmingham, Michigan, on July 17, 2014. She suffered from diabetes and had stomach cancer. At the time of her death, three months after having had surgery for the disease, cancer was not cited as a cause of her death. She is buried at Memorial Park Cemetery in Skokie, Illinois.

== Acting credits ==
=== Theatre ===
Sources: Internet Broadway Database; TCM

- Bobino (1944) (The New School)
- The Private Life of the Master Race (1945) (City College of New York)
- Woman Bites Dog (1946) (Philadelphia)
- What Every Woman Knows (1946) (Westport Country Playhouse)
- Loco (1946) (Broadway)
- Made in Heaven (1947) (Broadway) (replacement for Jane Middleton)
- Angel in the Wings (1947) (Broadway)
- The Shape of Things (1947) (East Hampton, New York)
- The Little Foxes (1947) (Off-Broadway)
- Three Indelicate Ladies (1947) (New Haven, Connecticut)
- Texas Li'l Darling (1949) (Westport Country Playhouse)
- Yes, M'Lord (1949) (Broadway)
- Call Me Madam (1950) (Broadway standby for Ethel Merman and as the leading lady on the US National Tour)
- Anything Goes (1950) (Lambertville, New Jersey)
- Pal Joey (1952) (Broadway)
- Once Married, Twice Shy (1953) (Westport Country Playhouse)
- Panama Hattie (1954) (Louisville, Kentucky)
- Call Me Madam (1954) (The Muny)
- On Your Toes (1954) (Broadway)
- Bus Stop (1955) (Broadway)
- The Sin of Pat Muldoon (1957) (Broadway)
- Goldilocks (1958) (Broadway)
- Sail Away (1961) (Broadway and London)
- The Time of the Barracudas (1963) (closed on the road)
- Who's Afraid of Virginia Woolf? (1963) (Broadway) (replacement for Uta Hagen)
- I Married an Angel (1964) (US regional tour)
- Who's Afraid of Virginia Woolf? (1965) (US national tour)
- The King and I (1965) (US regional tour)
- The Grass Harp (1966) (Providence, Rhode Island)
- Wonderful Town (1967) (New York City Center)
- Any Wednesday (1967) (US national tour)
- Private Lives (1968) (Off-Broadway)
- Mame (1968) (US national tour)
- Mame (1969) (US regional tour)
- Company (1970) (Broadway, US national tour and London)
- Small Craft Warnings (1973) (London)
- The Gingerbread Lady (1974) (London)
- Suite in Two Keys (1982) (Paper Mill Playhouse)
- Dancing in the End Zone (1984) (Coconut Grove, Florida)
- Follies In Concert (1985) (Lincoln Center)
- Happy Birthday, Mr. Abbott! or Night of 100 Years (1987) (Broadway) (benefit concert)
- Broadway at the Bowl (1988) (Hollywood Bowl)
- Love Letters (1990) (Broadway) (replacement for Kate Nelligan)
- The Rodgers & Hart Revue (1991) (New York City)
- Cakewalk by Peter Feibleman (1993) (American Repertory Theater)
- Company (1993) (Terrace Theater and Vivian Beaumont Theater)
- Show Boat (1993) (Toronto and Broadway)
- A Delicate Balance (1996) (Broadway)
- Angela Lansbury – A Celebration (1996) (Broadway) (benefit concert)
- Sail Away (1999) In Concert (Carnegie Hall)
- Elaine Stritch at Liberty (2002) (Broadway, London, US national tour, and UK tour)
- Endgame (2008) (Brooklyn Academy of Music) as "Nell"
- The Full Monty (2009) (Paper Mill Playhouse)
- A Little Night Music (2010) (Broadway) (replacement for Angela Lansbury)

=== Film ===
Year	Title	Role	Notes
1956	The Scarlet Hour	Phyllis Rycker	
1956	Three Violent People	Ruby LaSalle	
1957	A Farewell to Arms	Helen Ferguson	
1958	The Perfect Furlough	Liz Baker	
1959	Kiss Her Goodbye	Marge Carson	
1965	Who Killed Teddy Bear	Marian Freeman	
1966	Too Many Thieves	Miss G	
1970	The Sidelong Glances of a Pigeon Kicker	Tough Lady	
1970	Original Cast Album: Company	Herself (Joanne)	Documentary
1975	The Spiral Staircase	Nurse Baker	
1977	Providence	Helen Wiener	
1987	September	Diane	
1988	Cocoon: The Return	Ruby Feinberg	
1990	Sparks: The Price of Passion	Marti Sparks	
1990	Cadillac Man	Widow	
1997	Out to Sea	Mavis LaBreche	
1998	Krippendorf's Tribe	Irene Hargrove	
2000	Screwed	Virginia Crock	
2000	Small Time Crooks	Chi Chi Potter	
2000	Autumn in New York	Dolores "Dolly" Talbot	
2003	Broadway: The Golden Age, by the Legends Who Were There	Herself	Documentary
2004	Elaine Stritch at Liberty	Herself	Documentary
2005	The Needs of Kim Stanley	Herself	Documentary
2005	Monster-in-Law	Gertrude Fields	
2005	Romance & Cigarettes	Grace Murder	
2012	ParaNorman	Grandma Babcock (voice)	
2013	Elaine Stritch: Shoot Me	Herself	Documentary
2014	River of Fundament	Eulogist	
2018	Broadway: Beyond the Golden Age	Herself	Documentary^{†}

=== Television ===
Year	Title	Role	Notes
1948	The Philco Television Playhouse	Little Nettie	Episode: "Angel in the Wings"
1949	The Growing Paynes	Laraine Payne	
1951	Once Upon a Tune		Episode: "Three Little Pigs"
1951	Rocky King, Detective		Episode: "No Soap"
1953	Kraft Television Theater		Episode: "A Cup of Kindness"
1953–1955	Goodyear Playhouse	Various Characters	Episodes: "Nothing to Sneeze At" "Here's Father" "Beloved Stranger"
1954	The Motorola Television Hour	Hazel Beck	Episode: "The Family Man"
1955	Norby		Episode: "Helen's Holiday"
1955	Appointment with Adventure		Episode: "Escape from Vienna"
1955	Mister Peepers		Episode: "Episode #4.27"
1955	Matinee Theatre		Episode: "Coming of Age"
1957	The Alcoa Hour	Laura	Episode: "He's for Me"
1958	The DuPont Show of the Month	Aunt Bertha	Episode: "The Red Mill"
1958	Climax!	Kristie Crane	Episode: "The Disappearance of Daphne"
1958	Studio One	Shirley	Episode: "The Left-Handed Welcome"
1959	True Story	Lois Kirby	Episode: "Episode dated 22 August 1959"
1959	Adventures in Paradise	Ethel Forester	Episode: "Haunted"
1960	Wagon Train	Tracy Sadler	Episode: "The Tracy Sadler Story"
1960	Alcoa Theatre	Ruth Sherwood	Episode: "You Should Meet My Sister"
1960	Goodyear Theatre	Ruth Sherwood	Episode: "You Should Meet My Sister"
1960–1961	My Sister Eileen	Ruth Sherwood	27 Episodes
1963	The Doctors and the Nurses	Irma Downey	Episode: "The Witch of the East Wing"
1965–1966	The Trials of O'Brien	Miss G	13 episodes
1971	The Powder Room		TV Movie
1973	Pollyanna	Aunt Polly	
1973–1979	Jackanory	Storyteller	15 Episodes
1974	Dial M for Murder	Geneva	Episode: "If You Knew Susie"
1974	The President's Last Tape	Priscilla	TV Movie
1975	Shades of Greene	Patience	Episode: "Two Gentle People"
1975–1979	Two's Company	Dorothy McNab	29 episodes
1979–1980	Tales of the Unexpected	Mary Pearl; Pamela Beauchamp	Episodes: "William and Mary "My Lady Love, My Dove"
1980–1982	Nobody's Perfect	Bill Hooper	14 Episodes
1981	Christmas Spirits	Julia Myerson	TV Movie
1981	Trapper John, M.D.	Dr. Mary Gerrard	Episode: "Supernurse"
1983–1984	The Edge of Night	Mrs. DeGroot	14 episodes
1986	Great Performances	Hattie Walker	Episode: "Follies in Concert"
1986	Stranded	Maxine	TV Movie
1986–1987	The Ellen Burstyn Show	Sydney Brewer	13 episodes
1988	Tattingers	Frany	Episode: "Rest in Peas"
1989–1990	The Cosby Show	Mrs. McGee	3 episodes
1990	The Secret Life of Archie's Wife	Rowena Sharphorn	TV Movie
1990	Head of the Class	Mrs. Hartman	2 episodes
1990	American Playhouse	Marianne	Episode: "Sensibility and Sense"
1990	Sparks: The Price of Passion	Marti Sparks	TV Movie
1990	Steel Magnolias	Ouiser Boudreaux	TV Movie
1991	Chance of a Lifetime	Sybil Sedgwick	TV Movie
1991	An Inconvenient Woman	Rose	TV Mini Series
1992; 1997	Law & Order	Defense Attorney Lanie Stieglitz	2 episodes
1993	One Life to Live	Wilma Bern #2	
1995	Bless This House	Sheila	Episode: "Misery on 34th Street"
1996	Late Show with David Letterman	Cameo	1 episode
1997	3rd Rock from the Sun	Martha Albright	Episode: "Dick-in-Law"
1997-1998	Soul Man	Mrs. Foster	
1998	An Unexpected Life	Lucinda Sadwich	TV Movie
1998	Oz	Judge Grace Lema	Episode: "Losing Your Appeal"
2000-2003	EGG, the Arts Show	Self/Narrator	
2001	3rd Rock from the Sun	Martha Albright	Episode: "My Mother, My Dick"
2003	Life's a Bitch	Mom	
2007	Paradise	Isabella	TV Movie
2007–2012	30 Rock	Colleen Donaghy	9 episodes
2014	Randy Cunningham: 9th Grade Ninja	Ruth (voice)	Episode: "Fudge Factory/Best Buds"; Final role; Posthumous release; dedicated in memory

== Awards and honors ==
The Tony Award for Best Special Theatrical Event was awarded to the producers of Elaine Stritch at Liberty. However, Stritch enthusiastically accepted the award at the 56th Tony Awards, later complaining that her acceptance speech was cut off by the strains of the orchestra, which left her feeling angry.

The Primetime Emmy Award for Outstanding Variety, Music, or Comedy Special for the HBO special of Elaine Stritch at Liberty, was awarded to its producers.

Stritch was inducted into the American Theater Hall of Fame in 1995.

== In popular culture ==
Stritch's voice and vocal delivery are spoofed in the Forbidden Broadway songs "The Ladies Who Screech" and "Stritch", parodies of "The Ladies Who Lunch" and "Zip", songs she performed in the musicals Company and Pal Joey.

In 2009, a parody by Bats Langley entitled "How the Stritch Stole Christmas" (loosely based on "How the Grinch Stole Christmas") appeared on YouTube.

On The Big Gay Sketch Show in 2007, she was spoofed (portrayed by Nicol Paone) as a Wal-Mart greeter who is still a theater gal at heart. In a later episode, Stritch is spoofed as an airport security guard, who's still "on" and isn't able to tone down her over-the-top antics. In yet another episode, "Stritch" is promoting her self-titled perfume "Stritchy" in dramatic fashion when she is confronted by the real-life Elaine Stritch, who makes a cameo appearance.

Starting in 2024, her cover version of "Are You Havin' Any Fun?" was the soundtrack of a series of TV commercials for the Volkswagen ID. Buzz.
