= Higher and Higher (film) =

1944 film by Tim Whelan

- Theatrical poster
- Directed by: Tim Whelan
- Written by: Musical: Gladys Hurlbut; Joshua Logan; Screenplay: Jay Dratler; Ralph Spence; Add'l dialogue: William Bowers; Howard Harris.
- Produced by: Tim Whelan
- Starring: Michèle Morgan; Jack Haley; Frank Sinatra
- Cinematography: Robert De Grasse
- Edited by: Gene Milford
- Music by: Songs: Jimmy McHugh (music); Harold Adamson (lyrics); Score: Constantin Bakaleinikoff
- Distributed by: RKO
- Release date: January 1, 1944 (US)
- Running time: 90 minutes
- Country: United States
- Language: English
- Budget: $600,000
- Box office: $2 million

Higher and Higher is a 1944 musical film starring Michèle Morgan, Jack Haley, and Frank Sinatra, loosely based on a 1940 Broadway musical written by Gladys Hurlbut and Joshua Logan. The film version, written by Jay Dratler and Ralph Spence with additional dialogue by William Bowers and Howard Harris, diverges significantly from its source.

The film has songs by Jimmy McHugh (music) and Harold Adamson (lyrics), as well as one song by Rodgers and Hart, "Disgustingly Rich", that remains from the stage production.

== Plot ==
The household staff of millionaire piano manufacturer Cyrus Drake has not been paid for seven months when his bankruptcy and impending foreclosure is announced. With the wife and daughter of Cyrus on a long trip abroad, a scheme is formed to pass off the attractive young scullery maid Millie as the socialite daughter, Pamela Drake, and marry her off to a rich man so there will be money for all.

The valet, Mike O'Brien, helps with the transformation, unaware that Millie is secretly in love with him. Asked if she had ever been courted, Millie mentions that she likes the way a young man next door sometimes sings to her—Frank Sinatra; his crooning is featured, to the delight of his bobby soxer fan base. There are also many tongue-in-cheek jokes at his expense, e.g. "You sound like someone I've heard on the radio!" and "I'm going to listen to Bing!".

The social secretary, Sandy, begins to teach Millie the proper etiquette and how to walk and talk like a debutante. At her coming-out ball, where Georgia Keating, a high-society friend of the Drakes, wants her daughter Katherine to be considered the most desirable deb, Millie is nudged toward Sir Victor Fitzroy Victor, K.B.O.B.E, a titled nobleman she should marry.

No one there knows that Victor cannot even pay his hotel bill, and is actually a petty thief named Joe Brown. He is hoping to catch a rich girl to pay off his own debts. Millie is not in love, but agrees to marry him for everyone's sake. Mike mistakenly thinks that she's in love with Frank, so he helps Millie get out of the wedding at the last minute. Mike also stumbles onto a hidden speakeasy in the Drake basement, which contains the Drake family's valuable first harpsichord and a fully stocked wine cellar. When the place is opened as "Drake's Amsterdam Tavern, New York's most novel nightclub", their financial troubles are over. Victor, aka Joe Brown, works there as a bartender. Finally realizing his love for Millie, Mike nobly bows out so she can be with Frank. Mike leaves to resume his vaudeville career. When he receives an invitation to Frank and Katherine's wedding, Mike returns to confront Frank for spurning Millie. Much to his surprise, he finally learns that Millie has only ever been in love with him. Mike and Millie begin their romance, dancing beautifully Higher and Higher into the clouds.

== Main cast ==
- Michèle Morgan as Millie Pico
- Jack Haley as Mike O'Brien
- Frank Sinatra as Frank Sinatra
- Leon Errol as Cyrus Drake
- Marcy McGuire as Mickey
- Victor Borge as Sir Victor Fitzroy Victor
- Mary Wickes as Sandy
- Elisabeth Risdon as Georgia
- Barbara Hale as Katherine
- Mel Tormé as Marty
- Paul Hartman as Byngham
- Grace Hartman as Hilda
- Dooley Wilson as Oscar
- Ivy Scott as Mrs. Whiffin

== Production notes ==
Higher and Higher marked the second of Sinatra's forty-plus film credits. (His first was in the film Reveille with Beverly, in which he played himself.)

== Reception ==
Writing in The Nation January 1, 1944, critic James Agee stated, "Through most of the film Sinatra is just a sort of male Mary Pickford, a mock-shy, poised young man huskily husking Occidental and very mortal corn. At the end ...he stands without visible support among clouds, in an effect which could be described only in the unmailable terms of an erotic dream, and swells from a pinpoint to a giant. Higher and higher indeed."

The film made a profit of $780,000.

== Awards ==
The film was nominated for a 1945 Oscar for Best Music, Original Song for the song "I Couldn't Sleep a Wink Last Night", and also for Best Music, Scoring of a Musical Picture for Constantin Bakaleinikoff.
