= Harold Hastings =

American composer and conductor

Harold Hastings (19 December 1916 – 30 May 1973) was an American composer and conductor. He was born in New York City and subsequently studied at New York University. In his early career, he conducted radio and television orchestras. He also composed music for television advertisements. In 1950, he composed the music for the Broadway revue Tickets, Please!. Following this, he began work on Broadway as an arranger, orchestrator, and musical director. From 1950 to 1973, he worked as musical director or arranger for twenty-five Broadway musicals, several of which became renowned classics of Broadway. In 1973, he died of an apparent heart attack at his home in Larchmont, New York.

== Selected work ==
- Tickets, Please! (1950)
- A Funny Thing Happened on the Way to the Forum (1962)
- She Loves Me (1963)
- Cabaret (1966)
- Company (1970)
- Follies (1971)
- A Little Night Music (1973)
