= Harold J. Stone =

American actor (1913–2005)

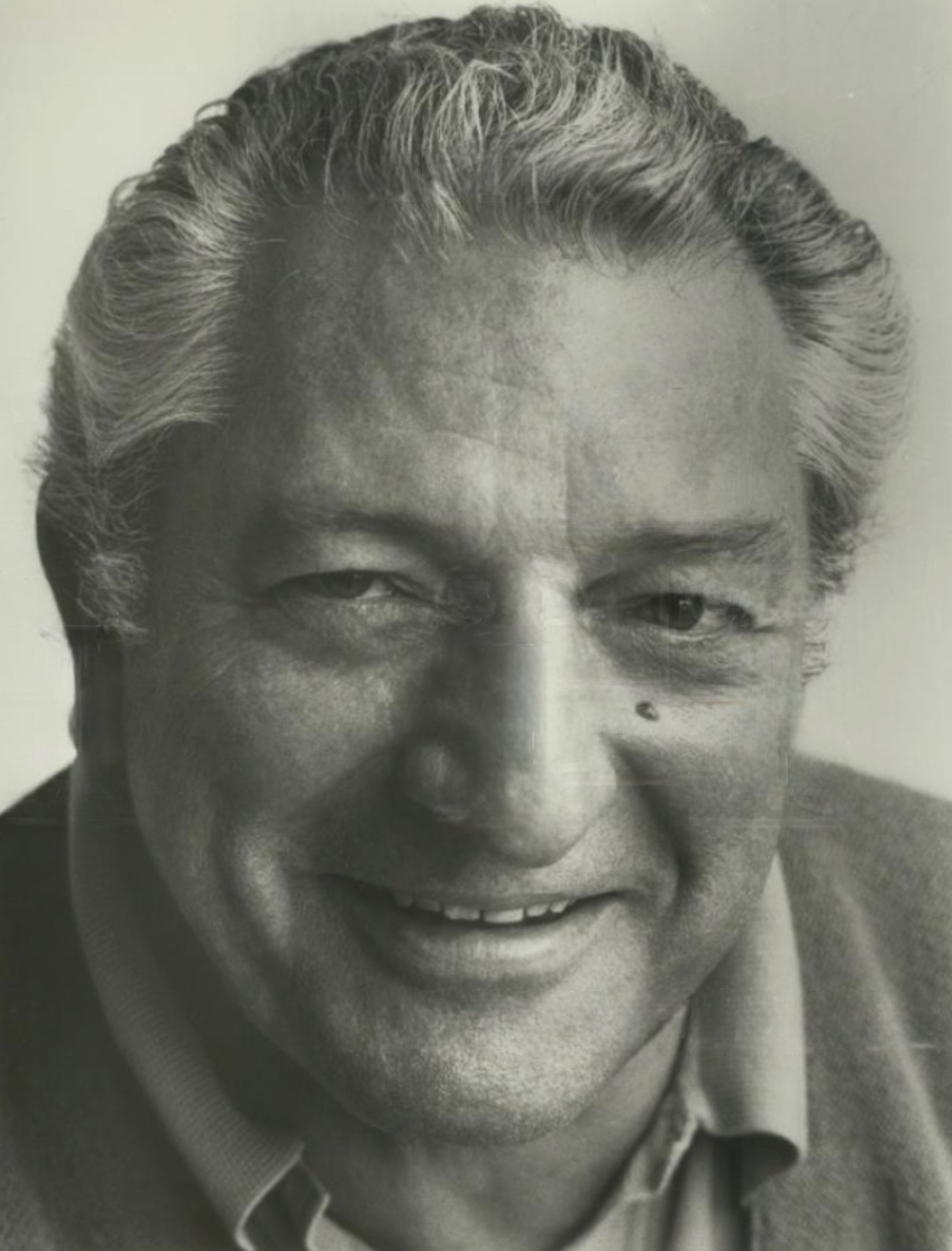
- Stone in 1972
- Born: Harold Hochstein; March 3, 1913; New York City, U.S.
- Died: November 18, 2005 (aged 92); Woodland Hills, Los Angeles, California, U.S.
- Occupations: Actor; stage director
- Years active: 1939–1986
- Spouse(s): Jean (died 1960) Miriam (m. 1962)
- Children: 3

Harold J. Stone (born Harold Hochstein; March 3, 1913 – November 18, 2005) was an American stage, radio, film, and television character actor.

== Early life and stage career ==
Stone was born an only child into a Jewish acting family, the son of Jacob Hochstein (1877–1931) and Jennie Pearl Hochstein (née Levison, 1879–1946). At age six, Stone debuted on stage with his father in the play White Slaves. A graduate of New York University, he attended the University of Buffalo to study medicine but was forced to drop out to support his mother and fell back on acting.

After gaining considerable acting experience in various plays during the 1930s, Stone was finally cast on Broadway, where between 1939 and the early 1950s, he appeared in a series of critically acclaimed productions such as One Touch of Venus and Stalag 17. Some of his other Broadway credits include Morning Star (1939), A Bell for Adano (1944), S.S. Glencairn (1947), Abraham Cochrane (1963), Charley's Aunt (1970), and Ring Around the Bathtub (1971).

== Film and television ==
Stone made his motion-picture debut in the Alan Ladd film noir classic The Blue Dahlia (1946). He then went on to work in small but memorable roles in such films as The Harder They Fall (1956) with Humphrey Bogart, Alfred Hitchcock's The Wrong Man (1956), Somebody Up There Likes Me (1956), The Garment Jungle (1957), House of Numbers (1957), Tales of Wells Fargo (1957),The Invisible Boy (1957), Spartacus (1960), The Chapman Report (1962), X: The Man with the X-ray Eyes (1963), The Greatest Story Ever Told (1965), Girl Happy (1965), The St. Valentine's Day Massacre (1967, as Frank Nitti), The Big Mouth (1967), the Danish film The Olsen Gang in a Fix (1969), The Seven Minutes (1971), Mitchell (1975), and Hardly Working (1980).

By 1949, Stone began to work increasingly on television, as well as in films. That year, he co-starred on the short-lived live television sitcom The Hartmans. He also performed as Jake Goldberg in the comedy-drama The Goldbergs and as Lieutenant Hauser in the crime series The Walter Winchell File. In 1958, he played Rafe Larkin in the episode "The Last Comanchero" on the ABC/Warner Bros. Western series Cheyenne, and the next year he co-starred as a principal investigator in the syndicated series Grand Jury. In the 1961–1962 season, Stone appeared three times in Stephen McNally's ABC crime drama Target: The Corruptors!. Then, in 1963, he appeared with Marsha Hunt in the ABC medical drama Breaking Point. In September 1964, he appeared in the Western series Bonanza in the episode "The Hostage". Also in 1964, Stone performed as the character of Greenbriar in the episode "The Fluellen Family" on the action-adventure series Daniel Boone.

In 1969–1970, Stone portrayed Hamilton Greeley in the NBC comedy series My World and Welcome to It. He also played Sam Steinberg on the 1972–1973 CBS comedy Bridget Loves Bernie, and had the role of Charlie on the CBS comedy Joe and Sons (1975–1976).

Stone eventually made more than 150 guest appearances on television series between the 1950s and mid-1980s. Some of those other series are U.S. Marshal, Cheyenne, Stagecoach West, The Rifleman, Gunsmoke, Wagon Train, Cimarron City, The Restless Gun, The Alaskans, The Barbara Stanwyck Show, Sugarfoot, The Islanders, The Tall Man, The Roaring 20's, Empire, I Spy, The Virginian, The Untouchables, Wanted: Dead or Alive, Mr. Novak, The Twilight Zone, Route 66, Have Gun – Will Travel, The Big Valley, Trackdown (three episodes), Going My Way, Gilligan's Island, Hogan's Heroes (three episodes), Hawaii Five-O, Mannix, Get Smart, Griff, Alfred Hitchcock Presents, Welcome Back Kotter, Three's Company, Barney Miller (three episodes) and Charlie's Angels.

== Personal life and death ==
Stone was married twice. His first wife, Jean, died in 1960. He married again in 1962, but two years later separated from his second wife. He had two sons and one daughter. Stone died on November 18, 2005, at age 92, from natural causes at the Motion Picture and Television Retirement Home in the Woodland Hills section of Los Angeles.

== Awards ==
In 1964, Stone was nominated for an Emmy Award for Outstanding Single Performance by an Actor in a Leading Role for his role in the CBS dramatic series The Nurses.

== Filmography ==
- The Blue Dahlia (1949)
- The Harder They Fall (1956) as Art Leavitt
- Somebody Up There Likes Me (1956) as Nick Barbella
- Back from Eternity (1956) as Dealer (uncredited)
- The Wrong Man (1956) as Detective Lieutenant Bowers
- Slander (1957) as Seth Jackson
- Man Afraid (1957) as Lieutenant Marlin
- The Garment Jungle (1957) as Tony
- House of Numbers (1957) as Henry Nova - Prison Guard
- The Invisible Boy (1957) as General Swayne
- These Thousand Hills (1959) as Ram Butler
- Spartacus (1960) as David
- The Chapman Report (1962) as Frank Garnell
- Showdown (1963) as Lavalle
- X: The Man with the X-ray Eyes (1963) as Dr. Sam Brant
- The Greatest Story Ever Told (1965) as General Varus
- Girl Happy (1965) as Big Frank
- Affair with a Killer (1966) edited a two-part episode (Don't Forget to Wipe the Blood Off) from the television series Seaway together into a feature film.
- The St. Valentine's Day Massacre (1967) as Frank Nitti
- The Big Mouth (1967) as Thor
- The Olsen Gang in a Fix (1969) as Serafimo "Spats" Motzarella [sic]
- Which Way to the Front? (1970) as General Buck
- The Seven Minutes (1971) as Judge Upshaw
- Pickup on 101 (1972) as 2nd Farmer
- The Photographer (1974) as Lieutenant Luther Jacoby
- The Wild McCullochs (1975) as George
- Mitchell (1975) as Tony Gallano
- Hardly Working (1980) as Frank Loucazi

== Selected television appearances ==
- The Hartmans (1949) (Episode: "The Handyman")
- Wagon Train (1957) (Season 1 Episode 11: "The Zeke Thomas Story") as Zeke Thomas
- The Walter Winchell File (1957–1959) (2 episodes)
  - (Season 1 Episode 6: "The Decision") (1957) as "Bender"
  - (Season 2 Episode 9: "Death Comes in a Small Package: File #37") (1959) as "Lieutenant Hauser"
- Alfred Hitchcock Presents (1957–1961) (3 episodes)
  - (Season 2 Episode 31: "The Night the World Ended") as "Mr. Halloran" (1957)
  - (Season 3 Episode 28: "Lamb to the Slaughter") as "Lieutenant Jack Noonan" (1958)
  - (Season 6 Episode 38: "Ambition") as "Mac Davis" (1961)
- Have Gun - Will Travel (1957–1961) (3 episodes)
  - (Season 1 Episode 5: "A Matter of Ethics") (1957) as "Holgate"
  - (Season 1 Episode 16: "Helen of Abajinian") (1957) as "Samuel Abajinian"
  - (Season 4 Episode 25: "The Last Judgment") (1961) as "Judge Greenleaf"
- Gunsmoke (1957–1965) (7 episodes)
  - (Season 2 Episode 34: "Who Lives by the Sword") (1957) as "Joe Delk"
  - (Season 4 Episode 5: "Letter of the Law") (1958) as "Judge Rambeau"
  - (Season 4 Episode 33: "Buffalo Hunter") (1959) as "Gatluf"
  - (Season 7 Episode 3: "Miss Kitty") (1961) as "Horace"
  - (Season 9 Episode 34: "Homecoming") (1964) as "Orval"
  - (Season 10 Episode 8: "Hung High") (1964) as "Jim Downey"
  - (Season 10 Episode 36: "He Who Steals") (1965) as "Jeff Sutro"
- The Restless Gun (1958) (Season 1 Episode 25: "Sheriff Billy") as "Ben Reed"
- Trackdown (1958–1959) (3 episodes)
  - (Season 1 Episode 16: "The Witness") (1958) as "Aaron Yewcic"
  - (Season 2 Episode 10: "The Schoolteacher") (1958) as "Quince Flanders"
  - (Season 2 Episode 26: "Fear") (1959) as "Ambrose Hooker"
- Cheyenne (1958–1962) (2 episodes)
  - (Season 3 Episode 9: "The Last Comanchero") (1958) as "Rafe Larkin"
  - (Season 6 Episode 10: "The Wedding Rings") (1962) as "Perez"
- The Rifleman (1958–1963) (3 episodes)
  - (Season 1 Episode 2: "The Home Ranch") (1958) as Oat Jackford
  - (Season 3 Episode 1: "Trail of Hate") (1960) as "Benjamin Stark"
  - (Season 5 Episode 21: "The Bullet") (1963) as "The Marshall"
- Wanted: Dead or Alive (1960) (Season 3 Episode 2: "The Cure") as "Harry Simmons", reformed town drunk
- The Twilight Zone (1961) (Season 3 Episode 2: "The Arrival") as "Grant Sheckly"
- The Alfred Hitchcock Hour (1962–1964) (2 episodes)
  - (Season 1 Episode 9: "The Black Curtain") (1962) as Maury Epstein, the Taxi Driver
  - (Season 2 Episode 30: "The Second Verdict") (1964) as Mr. H.E. Osterman
- Bonanza (1964) (Season 6 Episode 2: "The Hostage") as "Chad Cord"
- Gilligan's Island (1965) (Season 1 Episode 34: "Goodbye Old Paint") as "Alexandre Gregor Dubov"
- Voyage to the Bottom of the Sea (1965) (Season 1 Episode 18: "Mutiny") as "Admiral Jiggs Starke"
- The Virginian (1965–1970) (5 episodes)
  - (Season 4 Episode 12: "The Laramie Road") (1965) as "Ev Clinchy"
  - (Season 4 Episode 30: "The Mark of a Man") (1966) as "Jake"
  - (Season 5 Episode 2: "Ride to Delphi") (1966) as "Einar Carlson"
  - (Season 7 Episode 15: "Death Wait") (1969) as "Grant Buchanan"
  - (Season 8 Episode 17: "Holocaust") (1970) as "Adam Southcort"
- The Big Valley (1966) (Season 1 Episode 19: "Teacher of Outlaws") as "Sam", the outlaw leader
- Get Smart (1966) (2 episodes)
  - (Season 1 Episode 27: "Ship of Spies Part 1") as "Captain Groman"
  - (Season 1 Episode 28: "Ship of Spies Part 2") as "Captain Groman"
- The Man from U.N.C.L.E. (1967) (Season 3 Episode 21: "The It's All Greek to Me Affair") as "Stavros Macropalous"
- Hogan's Heroes (1968–1971) (3 episodes)
  - (Season 4 Episode 11: "Bad Day in Berlin") (1968) as "Major Teppel"
  - (Season 5 Episode 10: "The Defector") (1969) as "Field Marshal Rudolph Richter"
  - (Season 6 Episode 23: "Look at the Pretty Snowflakes") (1971) as "General Strommberger"
- Mission: Impossible (1971) (Season 6 Episode 1: "Blind") as "John Lawton"
- The Rookies (1974) (Season 3, Episode 14: "Take Over") as Al Stelman
- Welcome Back, Kotter (1977) (Season 2 Episode 16: "Kotter and Son") as "Charlie Kotter" (Gabe's father)
- Barney Miller (1978–1980) (4 episodes)
  - (Season 5 Episode 1: "Kidnapping: Part 1") (1978) as "Mr. Siegel" (credit only)
  - (Season 5 Episode 2: "Kidnapping: Part 2") (1978) as "Mr. Siegel"
  - (Season 7 Episode 1: "Homicide: Part 1") (1980) as "Steven Haddad"
  - (Season 7 Episode 2: "Homicide: Part 2") (1980) as "Steven Haddad"
- Three's Company (1979) (Season 4 Episode 10: "The Loan Shark") as "Bernie Bustamente"
- Highway to Heaven (1986) (Season 2 Episode 14: "Close Encounters of the Heavenly Kind") as "Harvey Milsap"
