= Sunny (1941 film) =

1941 film by Herbert Wilcox

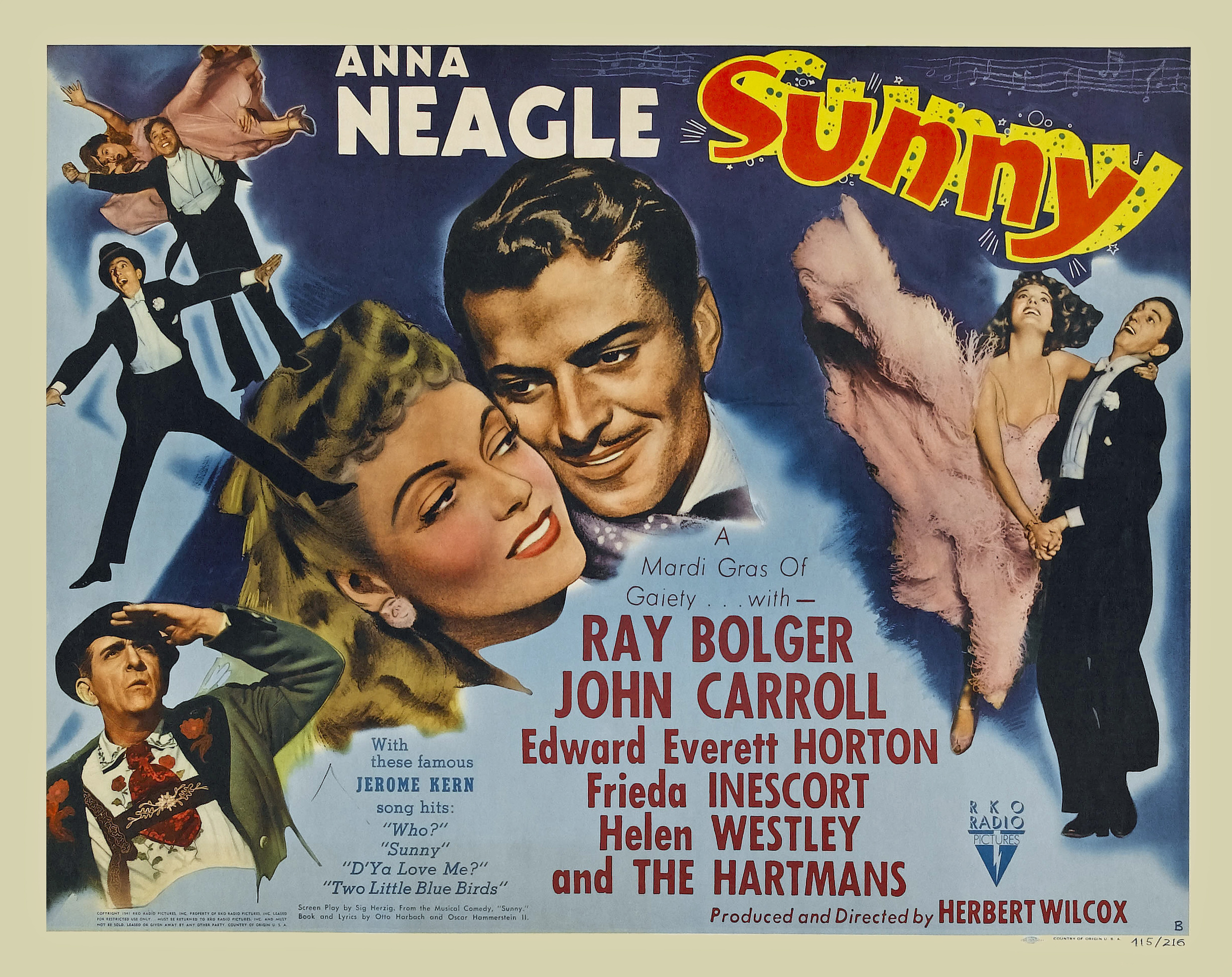
- Directed by: Herbert Wilcox
- Written by: Sig Herzig
- Based on: Sunny by Oscar Hammerstein II and Otto A. Harbach
- Produced by: Merrill G. White; Herbert Wilcox
- Starring: Anna Neagle; Ray Bolger; John Carroll
- Cinematography: Russell Metty
- Edited by: Elmo Williams
- Music by: Anthony Collins
- Production company: Suffolk Productions
- Distributed by: RKO Radio Pictures
- Release date: May 30, 1941
- Running time: 98 minutes
- Country: United States
- Language: English
- Budget: $676,000
- Box office: $1,096,000

Sunny is a 1941 American musical film directed by Herbert Wilcox and starring Anna Neagle, Ray Bolger, John Carroll, Edward Everett Horton, Grace Hartman, Paul Hartman, Frieda Inescort, and Helen Westley. It was adapted by Sig Herzig from the Jerome Kern-Oscar Hammerstein II musical play Sunny. It is the second film version of the musical; the first was Sunny, made in 1930.

== Plot ==
During the Mardi Gras festivities, Larry Warren, a member of a wealthy New Orleans family, meets equestrian and dancer Sunny O’Sullivan. The queen of hearts, who is out and about with her entourage in the festive turmoil, commands both of them to hug and kiss. When Sunny disappears into the darkness of the night after this hug, Larry, lost in thought, enters a circus that is located at the place where he met Sunny, still in the spirit of the young woman who has bewitched him. At the circus he unexpectedly meets his sister Elizabeth, the family lawyer Henry Bates and Juliet Runnymeade, a circus debutante with whom a circus actor does all sorts of mischief. To his great surprise and delight, he also sees Sunny dancing on stage with a partner and cannot have a bouquet of flowers sent to her quickly enough. After the show he tries to get in touch with Sunny to meet her. However, due to a misunderstanding, things turn out differently and instead of Larry, Sunny is out with her old friend and stage partner Bunny Billings.

By chance, Sunny and Larry meet again in the restaurant where Sunny is with Bunny and another friend. Larry steers the young woman away from her friends, and together they go on a tour of the city. When the night ends, they are both hopelessly in love and Larry proposes to Sunny.

After Sunny has said goodbye to her friends at the circus, Larry wants to introduce her to his aunt Barbara, who has been criticized as very harshly, as well as the rest of his family at the ancestral home of Waverly Hall. At the reception that takes place in the evening, Sunny is snubbed by Larry's sister Elizabeth and his aunt Barbara in such a way that she wants to leave the reception prematurely and deeply hurt, but meets Aunt Barbara and can talk to the outwardly tough woman.

On the day of the wedding, everything of name and standing is gathered in Waverly Hall. But then Bunny and the circus people arrive, who want to surprise Sunny. Elizabeth sees this as a good opportunity to humiliate Sunny again and to ask the circus troupe to show what they can do before the wedding ceremony. When these, encouraged by Juliet and her partner Egghead, begin to entertain, Larry expels the circus troupe from the house. Sunny is so stunned by such behavior from her future husband that she joins her guests and leaves the property with them.

On the premiere evening of the new circus show with Sunny in the center, the performance is completely sold out. When Sunny takes the stage, she discovers that Larry, who bought all the tickets, is the only guest. Angry and disappointed, she storms off the stage and locks herself in her trailer. Larry then puts it on a trailer of his car and drags the trailer and Sunny to a waiting riverboat. Sunny steals on deck after a while. When Larry does not find her in the trailer, but instead finds her fur and a shoe on the railing, he thinks she jumped overboard and jumps into the raging water to save her. Sunny is very afraid for him, but also realizes how much he loves her. As soon as Larry is safe, they both embrace.

== Cast ==
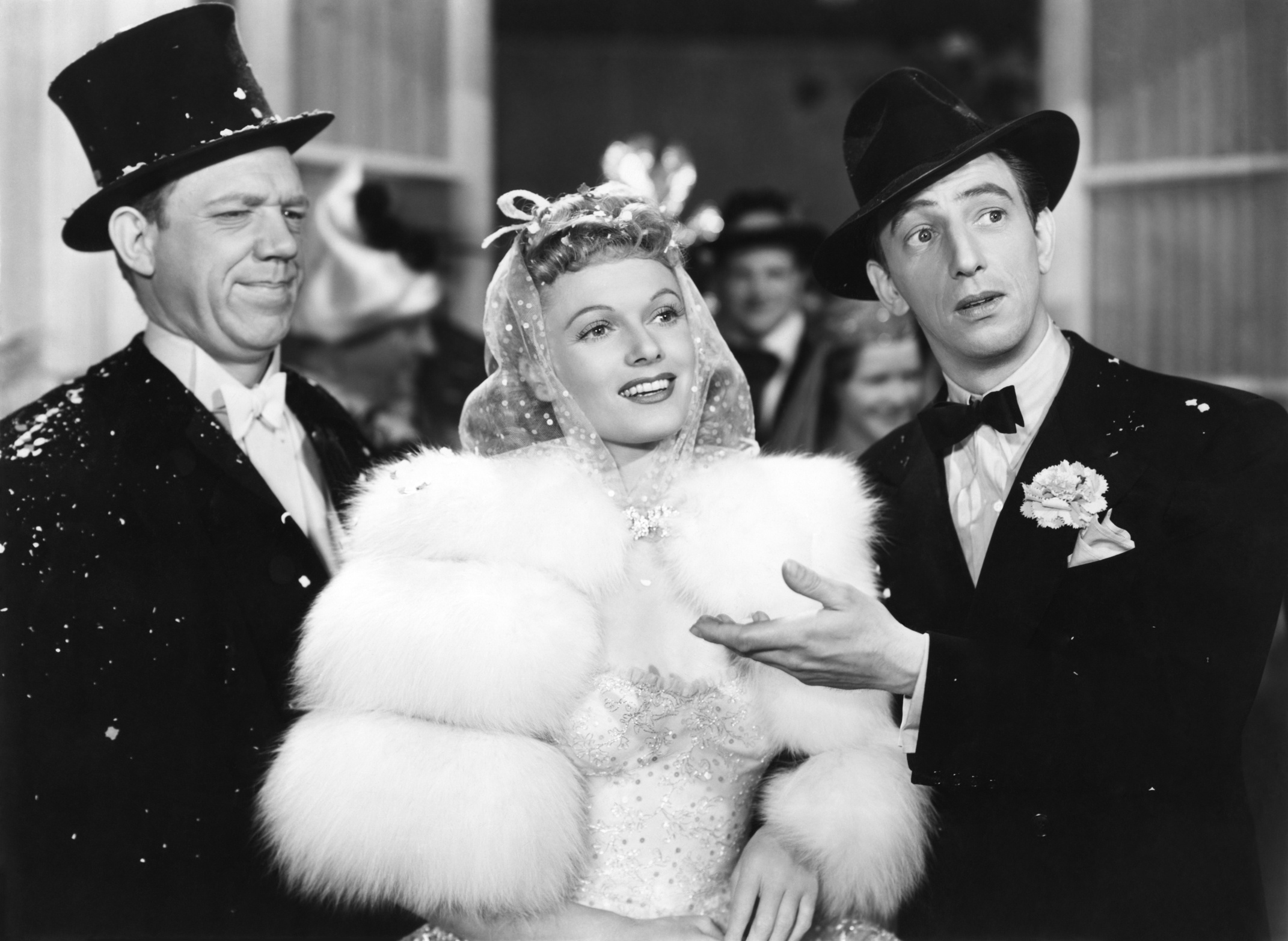
Paul Hartman, Anna Neagle & Ray Bolger

- Anna Neagle as Sunny O'Sullivan
- Ray Bolger as Bunny Billings
- John Carroll as Larry Warren
- Edward Everett Horton as Henry Bates
- Grace Hartman as Juliet Runnymede
- Paul Hartman as Egghead
- Frieda Inescort as Elizabeth Warren
- Helen Westley as Aunt Barbara
- Benny Rubin as Maj. Montgomery Sloan
- Muggins Davies as Muggins
- Richard Lane as Reporter
- Martha Tilton as Queen of Hearts
- Torben Meyer as Jean, Head waiter
- Larry Steers as Doctor Warren
- Halliwell Hobbes as Johnson
- Bess Flowers as Mrs. W. Wakefield
- John Ward as Colonel Redfield
- Edmund Mortimer as Mr. Runnymeade
- Peggy Remington as Mrs. Runnymeade
- Florence Wix as Mrs. H. Warren
- James Carlisle as Mr. W. Wakefield
- Edna Holland as Venus
- Fred Santley as Florist
- Kay Sutton as Brunette
- Lew Kelly as Stage Door Keeper
- James Flavin as Motorcycle Cop

== Soundtrack ==
- Anna Neagle and John Carroll - "D'ye Love Me?" (Music by Jerome Kern, lyrics by Otto A. Harbach and Oscar Hammerstein II)
- "Believe Me If All Those Endearing Young Charms" (Music traditional, Lyrics by Thomas Moore)
- Anna Neagle and Ray Bolger - "Jack Tar and Sam Gob"
- Martha Tilton and chorus - "The Lady Must Be Kissed"
- Danced by Ray Bolger - "Ringmaster"
- Anna Neagle - "Sunny" (Music by Jerome Kern, lyrics by Otto A. Harbach and Oscar Hammerstein II)
- Danced by Grace Hartman and Paul Hartman - "Two Little Love Birds" (Music by Jerome Kern, lyrics by Otto A. Harbach and Oscar Hammerstein II)
- Danced as "The Mohache"' by Grace Hartman and Paul Hartman - "Bolero" (Written by Maurice Ravel)
- Bolger also sung by Anna Neagle and John Carroll - "Who?" (Music by Jerome Kern, lyrics by Otto A. Harbach and Oscar Hammerstein II)

== Reception ==
The film made a profit of $7,000.

== Awards and honors ==
Year	Award	Category	Recipient(s) and nominee(s)	Result
1942	Academy Awards	Best Music, Scoring of a Musical Picture	Anthony Collins	Nominated

== Bibliography ==
- Fetrow, Alan G. Feature Films, 1940-1949: a United States Filmography. McFarland, 1994.
- Goble, Alan. The Complete Index to Literary Sources in Film. Walter de Gruyter, 1999.
