= John Bay =

American actor

- Born: John Marshall Bay; November 30, 1928; Chicago, Illinois, U.S.
- Died: November 7, 1982 (aged 53); University of Maryland Medical Center, Baltimore
- Occupations: Actor, playwright
- Spouse: Elaine Stritch (m. 1973)

John Marshall Bay (November 30, 1928 – November 7, 1982) was an American actor and playwright.

== Early life ==
Bay was born in Chicago, the location of his family's company, Bays English Muffins.

== Personal life and death ==
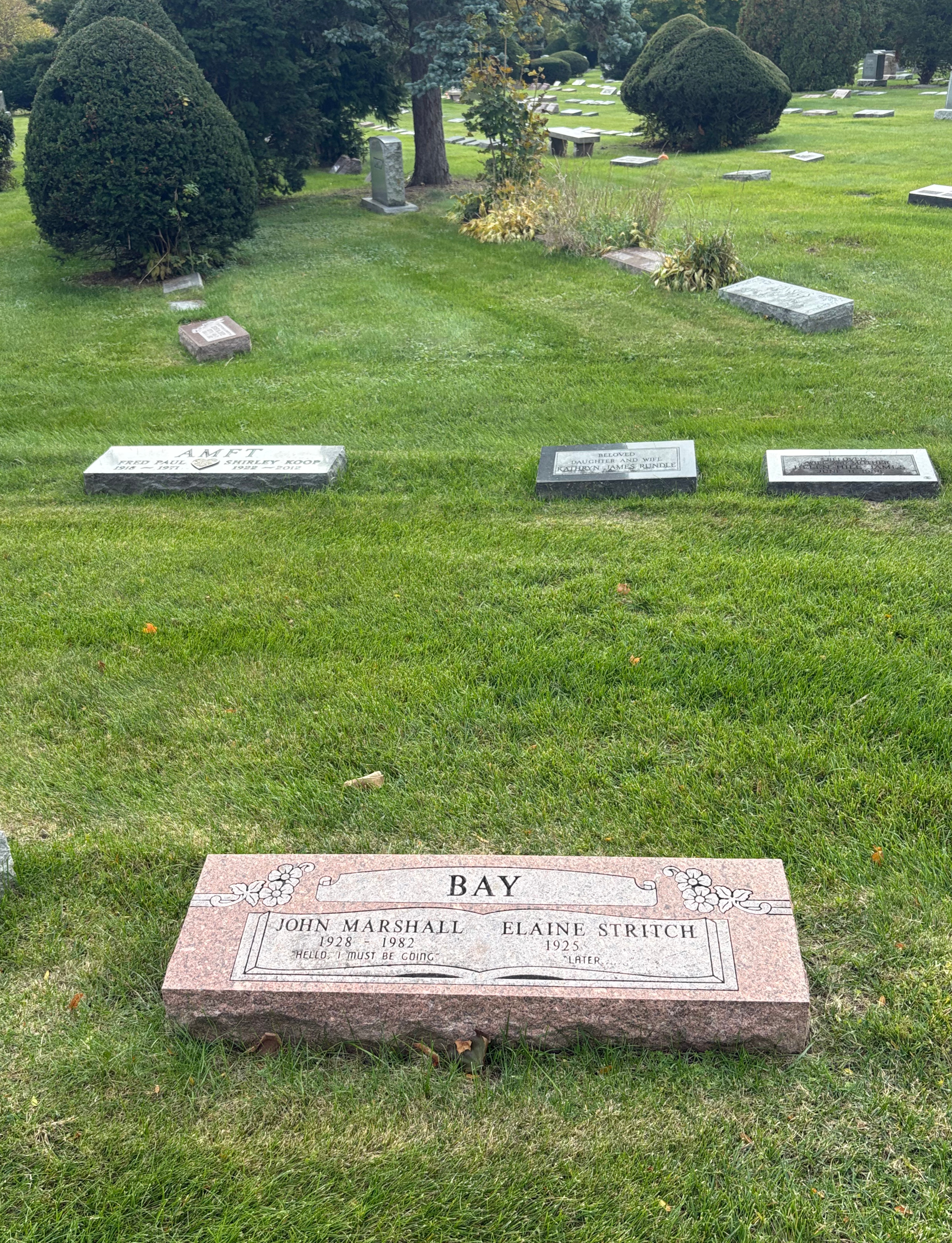
Bay's grave at Memorial Park Cemetery

He was married to the actress Elaine Stritch for nine years until his death from brain cancer in 1982. They are buried alongside each other at Memorial Park Cemetery in Skokie, Illinois.

== Career ==
Bay appeared in many productions, including the Doctor Who story The Crusade in 1965, playing the fourth Earl of Leicester. He also originated the role of Samovar in the original London production of A Day in Hollywood/A Night in the Ukraine. Bay also toured the United States in the early 1980s with his one-man play An Elephant in My Pajamas, based on the life of Groucho Marx.

== Partial filmography ==
- Design for Loving (1962) - Freddie
- Yellow Dog (1973) - Galloway
- Gold (1974) - Syndicate Member
- The Private Files of J. Edgar Hoover (1977) - Heywood Brown
