= Angel in the Wings =

Broadway musical revue 1947-1948

- Broadway Playbill
- Music: Bob Hilliard and Carl Sigman
- Lyrics: Bob Hilliard and Carl Sigman
- Book: Hank Ladd; Ted Luce; Paul Hartman; Grace Hartman
- Premiere: December 11, 1947: Coronet Theatre, New York City
- Productions: 1947 Broadway

Angel in the Wings is a 1947 musical revue with songs by Bob Hilliard and Carl Sigman and sketches by Hank Ladd, Ted Luce, Paul Hartman, and Grace Hartman.

== History ==
In addition to contributing sketches, the Hartmans headlined the original Broadway production at the Coronet Theatre (now the Eugene O'Neill Theatre) which ran for 308 performances, from December 11, 1947, to September 4, 1948. The production was considered a surprise hit, with the comic dancing couple Paul and Grace Hartman both receiving the first Tony Awards for Best Actor in a Musical and Best Actress in 1948. In her Broadway musical debut, the 22-year-old Elaine Stritch delivered the most notable song of the revue, "Civilization," which went on to become a standard. Although she only had one song in the revue, Stritch was said to have gotten the loudest applause. Also in the cast were Eileen Barton, Eugenie Baird, Nadine Gae, Peter Hamilton, Robert Stanton, Viola Roache, Johnny Barnes, Janet Gaylord, Alan Green, and Bill McGraw.

== Song list ==
- "Long Green Blues"
- "Up Early with the Upjohns"
- "Holler Blue Murder"
- "Breezy"
- "Swingeasy"
- "Civilization"
- "Apologia"
- "The Glamorous Ingabord"
- "Tambourine"
- "Trailer Trouble"
- "If It Were Easy to Do"
- "The Serious Note"
- "Thousand Islands Song"
- "The Salina Select Garden Club"
- "The Big Brass Band from Brazil"
