= Paul Hartman =

American actor and dancer (1904–1973)

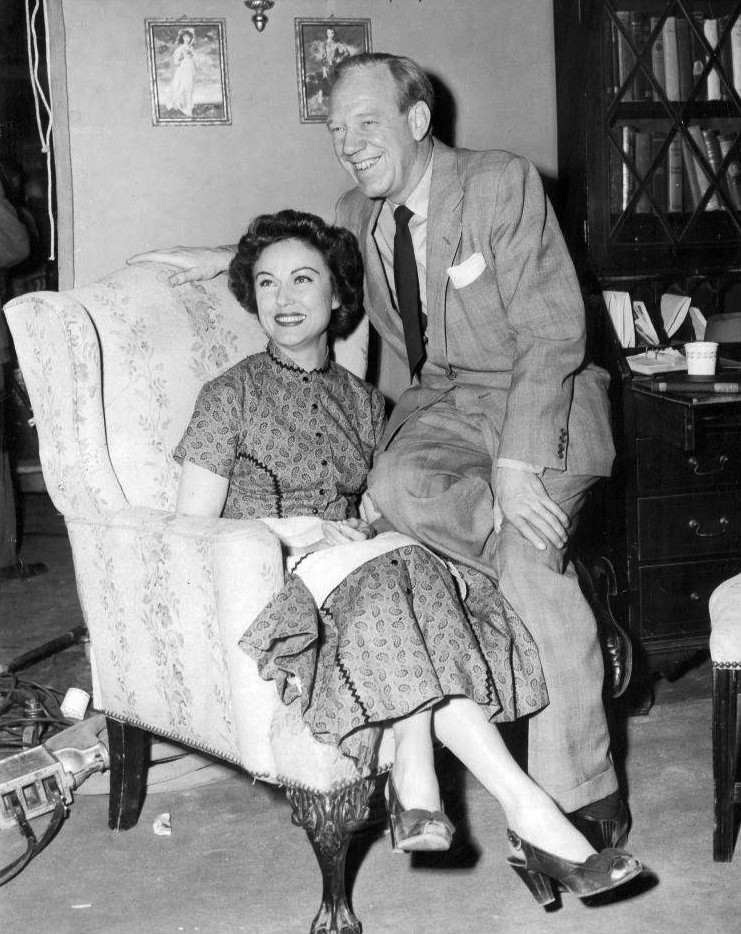
- Fay Wray and Hartman in The Pride of the Family (1953)
- Born: March 1, 1904; San Francisco, California, U.S.
- Died: October 2, 1973 (aged 69); Los Angeles, California, U.S.
- Occupations: Stage, film, and television actor
- Years active: 1932–1972
- Spouses: Grace Hartman (m. 1923; div. 1951) Ann Buckles (m. 1953; div. 1963)
- Awards: Leading Actor in a Musical; 1948 Angel in the Wings

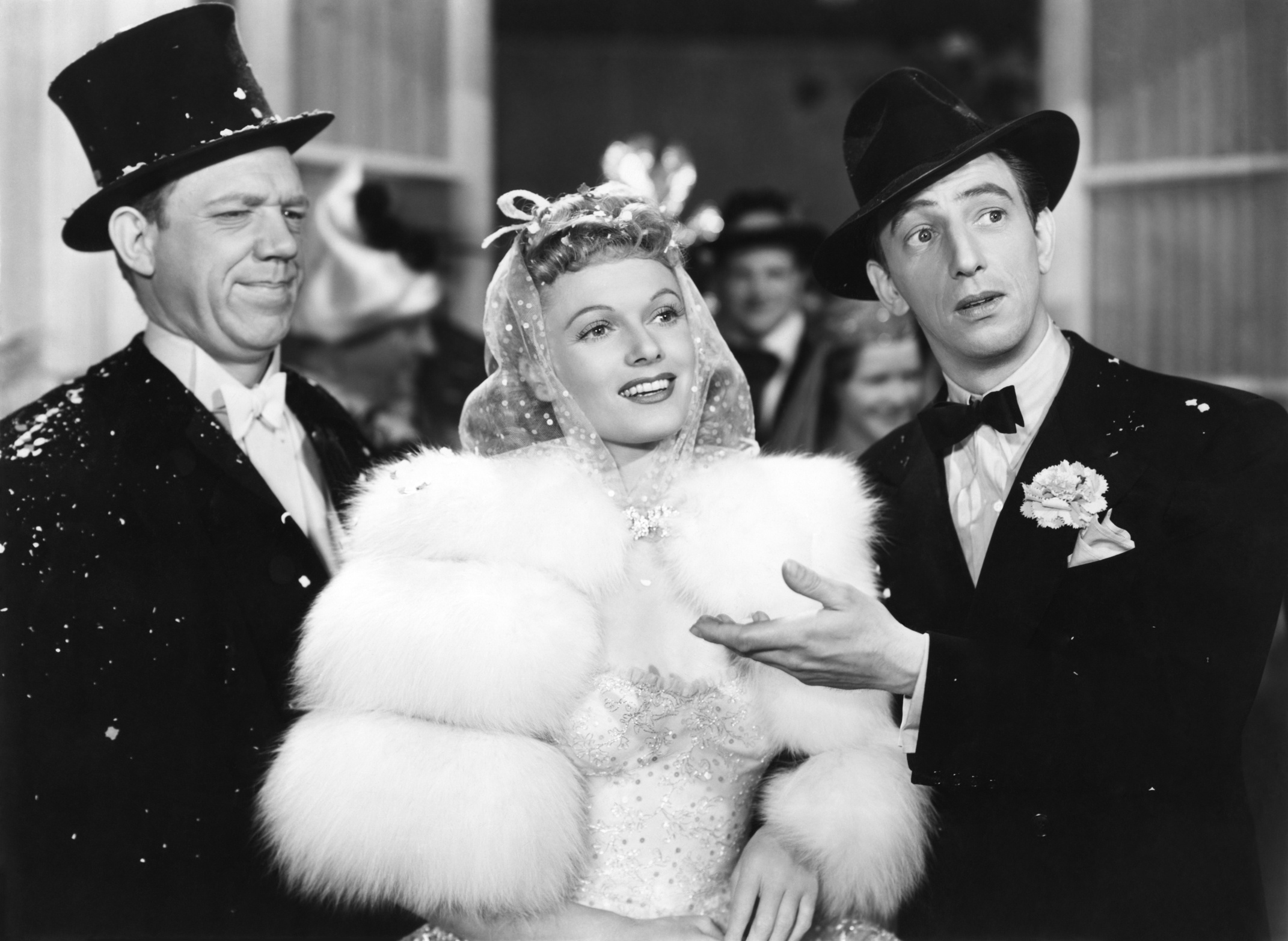
Paul Hartman, Anna Neagle & Ray Bolger in Sunny (1941)

Paul Hartman (March 1, 1904 – October 2, 1973) was an American dancer, stage performer and television actor.

== Early years ==
Born in San Francisco, Hartman was the son of Ferris Hartman, who was sometimes called the "Ziegfeld of the Pacific Coast" and actress Josie Hart. He began performing as a dancer with his sister when he was 4 years old. Hartman attended the University of California (UC). After he left there, he worked for a newspaper in San Francisco, beginning as a copy boy and later becoming a reporter. He left the newspaper for the theater because the latter offered more money. After graduating from UC, he worked "with a pick and shovel" as an employee of San Francisco in Golden Gate Park.

== Career ==
In 1922, he teamed up with Grace Barrett for a dancing comedy vaudeville act that consisted of them both paying homage to and gently mocking the popular dances of the day, from ballet to swing. They married in 1923.

Along with Grace, Paul made his Broadway debut in Ballyhoo of 1932. He appeared in Cole Porter's Red Hot and Blue (1936) and continued to perform on the Great White Way. Their act involved the crisp and witty Grace overwhelming the gangly, slack-jawed Paul, intermittently cut with dance numbers and musical comedy routines.

They went to Hollywood, where Paul appeared in 1943's Higher and Higher. Upon the Hartmans' return to Broadway, they resolved to take charge and write their own revue. They had the 1948 musical revue Angel in the Wings, and the Hartmans were named best lead actor and actress in a musical that year at the second Tony Awards (the first to recognize musical performers).

They were then offered a sitcom on NBC, and The Hartmans (at Home) showed promise, but audiences rejected the show, which often featured canned scripts and little opportunity for the couple to show their physical and musical abilities. Paul and Grace returned to Broadway, where they spent three years in a number of variety shows and revues. In 1951, he was elected a member of The Lambs, the famed theater club.

After divorcing in 1951, Grace was diagnosed with cancer in 1952. She died in 1955. Paul married actress Ann Buckles on March 14, 1953; they later divorced in 1963.

Television and Hollywood had once again risen to the top of the entertainment world, and the convenience of television shooting and a quick paycheck lured Paul to Los Angeles. Hartman appeared in the 1953–1954 sitcom The Pride of the Family as Albie Morrison, the father and head of the household. Fay Wray, best known for King Kong, played his wife and Natalie Wood and Robert Hyatt played his children.

In 1957, Hartman returned to Broadway, but then past age 50, he tired of the hectic stage life. He played bit parts in movies and television throughout the rest of his life, most famously as handyman Emmett Clark on The Andy Griffith Show and Mayberry R.F.D. In a nod to his earlier life, he is seen doing a dance routine at Howard Sprague's party in the Andy Griffith episode "The Wedding", and in the Mayberry, RFD episode "All for Charity", he can be seen doing a soft-shoe routine with costar Ken Berry. In addition, he had parts on Petticoat Junction; Love, American Style; The Adventures of Ozzie and Harriet; Hazel; Ben Casey; The Twilight Zone; The Alfred Hitchcock Hour; Our Man Higgins; and Family Affair.

He was cast in the 1960 film Inherit the Wind. In 1967, he appeared with Robert Morse in the film version of How to Succeed in Business Without Really Trying.

== Death ==
Hartman died on October 2, 1973 from a heart attack in Los Angeles, aged 69.

== Filmography ==
| Year | Title | Role | Notes |
|---|---|---|---|
| 1935 | Carnival in Flanders | | |
| 1937 | 45 Fathers | Joe McCoy | |
| 1941 | Sunny | Egghead | |
| 1943 | Higher and Higher | Byngham | |
| 1953 | Man on a Tightrope | Jaremir | |
| 1954 | Studio One | Juror No. 7 | "Twelve Angry Men" (TV episode) |
| 1960 | Inherit the Wind | Bailiff Mort Meeker | |
| 1960 | Alfred Hitchcock Presents | Milton Potter | season 5, episode 19: "Not the Running Type" |
| 1960 | Startime | James Medwick | season 1, episode 27: "Incident at a Corner" |
| 1961 | Alfred Hitchcock Presents | John | season 6, episode 28: "Gratitude" |
| 1961 | The Young Savages | Juror | uncredited |
| 1962 | Alfred Hitchcock Presents | Sammy Morrisey | season 7, episode 21: "Burglar Proof" |
| 1963 | The Alfred Hitchcock Hour | Trenker | season 1, episode 32: "Death of a Cop" |
| 1963 | The Thrill of It All | Dr. Taylor | |
| 1963 | Soldier in the Rain | Chief of Police | |
| 1964 | The Alfred Hitchcock Hour | Mr. Adams | season 2, episode 13: "The Magic Shop" |
| 1965 | Those Calloways | Charley Evans | |
| 1967 | How to Succeed in Business Without Really Trying | Toynbee | |
| 1967 | The Reluctant Astronaut | Rush | |
| 1967 | Luv | Doyle | |
