= Grace Hartman (actress) =

American actress (1907–1955)

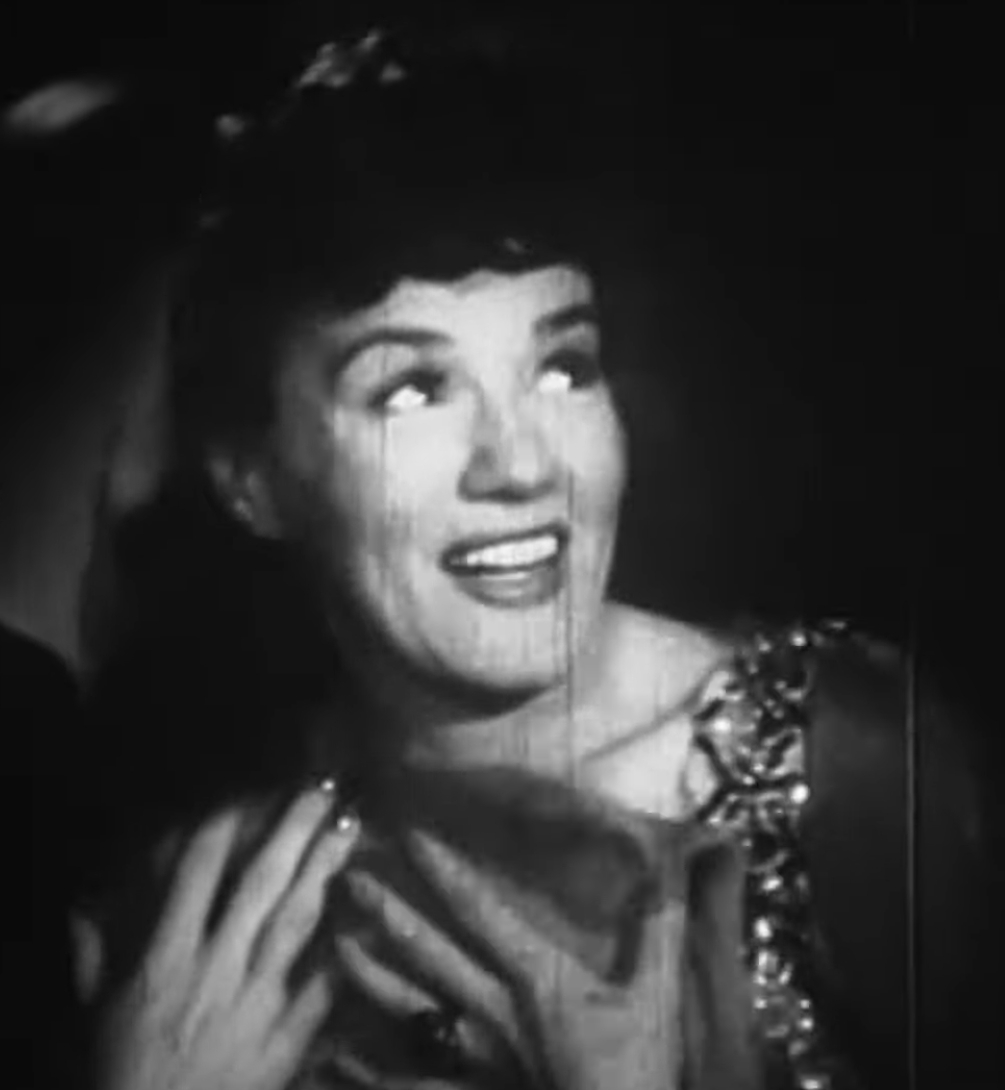
- Hartman in Sunny (1941)
- Born: Grace Barrett; January 7, 1907; San Francisco, California, U.S.
- Died: August 8, 1955 (aged 48); Van Nuys, California, U.S.
- Occupation: Actress
- Years active: 1932–1950
- Spouse: Paul Hartman (m. 1923; div. 1951)

Grace Adelaide Hartman (born Grace Barrett; January 7, 1907 – August 8, 1955) was an American stage and musical theatre actress.

== Biography ==
She was born in San Francisco, California. She was married to actor Paul Hartman from 1923 until they divorced in 1951. That same year, she married television director Norman Abbott.

In 1949, Hartman and her then-husband co-starred in The Hartmans, a comedy series on NBC-TV.

== Death ==
Grace Barrett Hartman Abbott died from cancer at her home in Van Nuys, California on August 8, 1955, aged forty-eight. She was survived by her husband, Norman Abbott, her stepchildren, Chrise and Billy Abbott, and the only child from her first marriage, television writer Ted Hartman.

== Productions ==
- Ballyhoo of 1932 (September 6, 1932 – November 26, 1932)
- Red, Hot and Blue (October 29, 1936 – April 10, 1937)
- Keep 'em Laughing (April 24, 1942 – May 28, 1942)
- Top-Notchers (May 29, 1942 – June 20, 1942)
- Sketches by Grace Hartman (December 11, 1947 – September 4, 1948)
- Angel in the Wings (January 22, 1949 – May 7, 1949)
- Tickets, Please! (April 27, 1950 – November 25, 1950)

== Filmography ==
Year	Title	Role	Notes
1940	Sunny	Juliet Runnymede	
1943	Higher and Higher	Hilda	
1949	The Hartmans	Herself	TV series

== Awards ==
She won a Tony Award for Best Leading Actress in a Musical for her role in Angel in the Wings.
