= Donaldson Awards =

Set of theatre awards

- Awarded for: Broadway theatre
- Location: New York City, New York
- Country: United States
- Rewards: Gold key and a scroll
- First award: 1944 (82 years ago)
- Final award: 1955 (71 years ago)

The Donaldson Awards were a set of theatre awards established in 1944 by the drama critic Robert Francis in honor of W. H. Donaldson (1864–1925), the founder of The Billboard (now Billboard) magazine.

Categories included "best new play", "best new musical", "best performance", "best debut" and "best costumes and set design". The winners were chosen by votes of the theatre community at large with no predetermined nominees and the winners were presented with a gold key and a scroll.

According to an article in Billboard, "The Donaldson Awards are the stages' accolades to their own."

The awards were discontinued in 1955 having been overshadowed by the Antoinette Perry Awards (Tony Awards).

== List of winners ==
(Note: on occasion a single performance won in multiple categories, such as Nanette Fabray winning as both actress and supporting actress for High Button Shoes.)

=== Plays ===
==== Play ====
- The Voice of the Turtle (1943–44)
- The Glass Menagerie (1944–45)
- State of the Union (1945–46)
- All My Sons (1946–47)
- A Streetcar Named Desire (1947–48)
- Death of a Salesman (1948–49)
- The Member of the Wedding (1949–50)
- Darkness at Noon (1950–51)
- The Shrike (1951–52)
- Picnic and The Crucible (1952–53)
- The Teahouse of the August Moon (1953–54)
- Cat on a Hot Tin Roof (1954–55)

==== First Play ====
- Born Yesterday (1945–46)
- No Exit (1946–47)
- Mister Roberts (1947–48)
- Edward, My Son (1948–49)
- The Member of the Wedding (1949–50)
- Billy Budd (1950–51)
- The Shrike (1951–52)
- The Love of Four Colonels (1952–53)
- Tea and Sympathy (1953–54)
- Inherit the Wind (1954–55)

==== Director (play) ====
- Moss Hart, Winged Victory (1943–44)
- John Van Druten, I Remember Mama (1944–45)
- Garson Kanin, Born Yesterday (1945–46)
- Elia Kazan, All My Sons (1946–47)
- Elia Kazan, A Streetcar Named Desire (1947–48)
- Elia Kazan, Death of a Salesman (1948–49)
- Harold Clurman, The Member of the Wedding (1949–50)
- Daniel Mann, The Rose Tattoo (1950–51)
- José Ferrer, The Shrike (1951–52)
- Joshua Logan, Picnic (1952–53)
- Elia Kazan, Tea and Sympathy (1953–54)
- Elia Kazan, Cat on a Hot Tin Roof (1954–55)

==== Actor (play) ====
- Paul Robeson, Othello (1943–44)
- Frank Fay, Harvey (1944–45)
- Louis Calhern, The Magnificent Yankee (1945–46)
- Laurence Olivier, Oedipus Rex (1946–47)
- Paul Kelly, Command Decision (1947–48)
- Lee J. Cobb, Death of a Salesman (1948–49)
- Sidney Blackmer, Come Back, Little Sheba (1949–50)
- Claude Rains, Darkness at Noon (1950–51)
- José Ferrer, The Shrike (1951–52)
- Tom Ewell, The Seven Year Itch (1952–53)
- Lloyd Nolan, The Caine Mutiny Court-Martial (1953–54)
- Paul Muni, Inherit the Wind (1954–55)

==== Actress (play) ====
- Margaret Sullavan, The Voice of the Turtle (1943–44)
- Laurette Taylor, The Glass Menagerie (1944–45)
- Judy Holliday, Born Yesterday (1945–46)
- Ingrid Bergman, Joan of Lorraine (1946–47)
- Judith Anderson, Medea (1947–48)
- Martita Hunt, The Madwoman of Chaillot (1948–49)
- Shirley Booth, Come Back, Little Sheba (1949–50)
- Uta Hagen, The Country Girl (1950–51)
- Julie Harris, I Am a Camera (1951–52)
- Shirley Booth, The Time of the Cuckoo (1952–53)
- Deborah Kerr, Tea and Sympathy (1953–54)
- Kim Stanley, Bus Stop (1954–55)

==== Supporting Actor (play) ====
- José Ferrer, Othello (1943–44)
- Anthony Ross, The Glass Menagerie (1944–45)
- Marlon Brando, Truckline Cafe (1945–46)
- Tom Ewell, John Loves Mary (1946–47)
- Karl Malden, A Streetcar Named Desire (1947–48)
- Arthur Kennedy, Death of a Salesman (1948–49)
- Dennis King, The Devil's Disciple (1949–50)
- Eli Wallach, The Rose Tattoo (1950–51)
- John Cromwell, Point of No Return (1951–52)
- John Williams, Dial "M" for Murder (1952–53)
- John Kerr, Tea and Sympathy (1953–54)
- Ed Begley, Inherit the Wind (1954–55)

==== Supporting Actress (play) ====
- Audrey Christie, The Voice of the Turtle (1943–44)
- Josephine Hull, Harvey (1944–45)
- Barbara Bel Geddes, Deep Are the Roots (1945–46)
- Margaret Phillips, Another Part of the Forest (1946–47)
- Kim Hunter, A Streetcar Named Desire (1947–48)
- Mildred Dunnock, Death of a Salesman (1948–49)
- Julie Harris, The Member of the Wedding (1949–50)
- Phyllis Love, The Rose Tattoo (1950–51)
- Marian Winters, I Am a Camera (1951–52)
- Kim Stanley, Picnic (1952–53)
- Jo Van Fleet, The Trip to Bountiful (1953–54)
- Eileen Heckart, The Bad Seed (1954–55)

==== Male Debut (play) ====
- Paul Douglas, Born Yesterday (1945–46)
- Claude Dauphin, No Exit (1946–47)
- James Whitmore, Command Decision (1947–48)
- Charles Boyer, Red Gloves (1948–49)
- Brandon deWilde, The Member of the Wedding (1949–50)
- Denholm Elliott, Ring Round the Moon (1950–51)
- John Hodiak, The Chase (1951–52)
- Menasha Skulnik, The Fifth Season (1952–53)
- Louis Jourdan, The Immoralist (1953–54)
- Buddy Hackett, Lunatics and Lovers (1954–55)

==== Female Debut (play) ====
- Susan Douglas, He Who Gets Slapped (1945–46)
- Patricia Neal, Another Part of the Forest (1946–47)
- June Lockhart, For Love or Money (1947–48)
- Martita Hunt, The Madwoman of Chaillot (1948–49)
- Joan Lorring, Come Back, Little Sheba (1949–50)
- Dominique Blanchar, L'Ecole des Femmes (1950–51)
- Audrey Hepburn, Gigi (1951–52)
- Geraldine Page, Mid-Summer (1952–53)
- Deborah Kerr, Tea and Sympathy (1953–54)
- Loretta Leversee, Home Is the Hero (1954–55)

==== Settings (play) ====
- Stewart Chaney, The Voice of the Turtle (1943–44)
- George Jenkins, I Remember Mama (1944–45)
- Jo Mielziner, Dream Girl (1945–46)
- Cecil Beaton, Lady Windermere's Fan (1946–47)
- Jo Mielziner, A Streetcar Named Desire (1947–48)
- Jo Mielziner, Death of a Salesman (1948–49)
- Jo Mielziner, The Innocents (1949–50)
- Frederick Fox, Darkness at Noon (1950–51)
- Cecil Beaton, The Grass Harp (1951–52)
- Lemuel Ayers, Camino Real (1952–53)
- Peter Larkin, The Teahouse of the August Moon (1953–54)
- Peter Larkin, Inherit the Wind (1954–55)

==== Costumes (play) ====
- Motley Theatre Design Group, Lovers and Friends (1943–44)
- Lucinda Ballard, I Remember Mama (1944–45)
- Motley Theatre Design Group, Pygmalion (1945–46)
- Cecil Beaton, Lady Windermere's Fan (1946–47)
- David Ffolkes, Man and Superman (1947–48)
- Christian Bérard, The Madwoman of Chaillot (1948–49)
- James Bailey, As You Like It (1949–50)
- Oliver Messel, Romeo and Juliet; and Castillo, Ring Round the Moon (1950–51)
- Audrey Gruddas, Caesar and Cleopatra (1951–52)
- Lemuel Ayers, Camino Real (1952–53)
- Richard Whorf, Ondine (1953–54)
- Cecil Beaton, Quadrille (1954–55)

=== Musicals ===
==== Musical ====
- Carmen Jones (1943–44)
- Carousel (1944–45)
- Show Boat (revival) (1945–46)
- Finian's Rainbow (1946–47)
- High Button Shoes (1947–48)
- South Pacific (1948–49)
- The Consul (1949–50)
- Guys and Dolls (1950–51)
- Pal Joey (revival) (1951–52)
- Wonderful Town (1952–53)
- The Golden Apple (1953–54)
- The Pajama Game (1954–55)

==== Director (musical) ====
- Hassard Short, Carmen Jones (1943–44)
- Rouben Mamoulian, Carousel (1944–45)
- George Abbott, Billion Dollar Baby (1945–46)
- Joshua Logan, Annie Get Your Gun (1946–47)
- George Abbott, High Button Shoes (1947–48)
- Joshua Logan, South Pacific (1948–49)
- Gian Carlo Menotti, The Consul (1949–50)
- George S. Kaufman, Guys and Dolls (1950–51)
- David Alexander, Pal Joey (1951–52)
- George Abbott, Wonderful Town (1952–53)
- Albert Marre, Kismet (1953–54)
- George Abbott and Jerome Robbins, The Pajama Game (1954–55)

==== Actor (musical) ====
- Bobby Clark, Mexican Hayride (1943–44)
- John Raitt, Carousel (1944–45)
- Ray Bolger, Three to Make Ready (1945–46)
- David Wayne, Finian's Rainbow (1946–47)
- Paul Hartman, Angel in the Wings (1947–48)
- Alfred Drake, Kiss Me, Kate (1948–49)
- Todd Duncan, Lost in the Stars (1949–50)
- Yul Brynner, The King and I (1950–51)
- Phil Silvers, Top Banana (1951–52)
- Thomas Mitchell, Hazel Flagg (1952–53)
- Alfred Drake, Kismet (1953–54)
- Cyril Ritchard, Peter Pan (1954–55)

==== Actress (musical) ====
- Mary Martin, One Touch of Venus (1943–44)
- Beatrice Lillie, Seven Lively Arts (1944–45)
- Betty Garrett, Call Me Mister (1945–46)
- Ethel Merman, Annie Get Your Gun (1946–47)
- Nanette Fabray, High Button Shoes (1947–48)
- Mary Martin, South Pacific (1948–49)
- Patricia Neway, The Consul (1949–50)
- Shirley Booth, A Tree Grows in Brooklyn (1950–51)
- Vivienne Segal, Pal Joey (1951–52)
- Rosalind Russell, Wonderful Town (1952–53)
- Shirley Booth, By the Beautiful Sea (1953–54)
- Mary Martin, Peter Pan (1954–55)

==== Supporting Actor (musical) ====
- Kenny Baker, One Touch of Venus (1943–44)
- Burl Ives, Sing Out, Sweet Land (1944–45)
- Tom Helmore, Day Before Spring (1945–46)
- David Wayne, Finian's Rainbow (1946–47)
- Jack McCauley, High Button Shoes (1947–48)
- Myron McCormick, South Pacific (1948–49)
- Wally Cox, Dance Me a Song (1949–50)
- Russell Nype, Call Me Madam (1950–51)
- Tony Bavaar, Paint Your Wagon (1951–52)
- Jack Whiting, Hazel Flagg (1952–53)
- Harry Belafonte, John Murray Anderson's Almanac (1953–54)
- Cyril Ritchard, Peter Pan (1954–55)

==== Supporting Actress (musical) ====
- June Havoc, Mexican Hayride (1943–44)
- Joan McCracken, Bloomer Girl (1944–45)
- Carol Bruce, Show Boat (1945–46)
- Polyna Stoska, Street Scene (1946–47)
- Nanette Fabray, High Button Shoes (1947–48)
- Juanita Hall, South Pacific (1948–49)
- Gloria Lane, The Consul (1949–50)
- Doretta Morrow, The King and I (1950–51)
- Helen Gallagher, Pal Joey (1951–52)
- Edie Adams (as Edith Adams), Wonderful Town (1952–53)
- Gwen Verdon, Can-Can (1953–54)
- Carol Haney, The Pajama Game (1954–55)

==== Male Debut (musical) ====
- Jules Munshin, Call Me Mister (1945–46)
- Albert Sharpe, Finian's Rainbow (1946–47)
- Sid Caesar, Make Mine Manhattan (1947–48)
- Ezio Pinza, South Pacific (1948–49)
- Wally Cox, Dance Me a Song (1949–50)
- Robert Alda, Guys and Dolls (1950–51)
- Tony Bavaar, Paint Your Wagon (1951–52)
- Ronny Graham, New Faces of 1952 (1952–53)
- Billy De Wolfe, John Murray Anderson's Almanac (1953–54)
- David Daniels, Plain and Fancy (1954–55)

==== Female Debut (musical) ====
- Pearl Bailey, St. Louis Woman (1945–46)
- Marion Bell, Brigadoon (1946–47)
- Valerie Bettis, Inside U.S.A. (1947–48)
- Yvonne Adair, Lend an Ear (1948–49)
- Gloria Lane, The Consul (1949–50)
- Vivian Blaine, Guys and Dolls (1950–51)
- Olga San Juan, Paint Your Wagon (1951–52)
- Edie Adams (as Edith Adams), Wonderful Town (1952–53)
- Hermione Gingold, John Murray Anderson's Almanac (1953–54)
- Julie Andrews, The Boy Friend (1954–55)

==== Dance Direction ====
- Agnes de Mille, One Touch of Venus (1943–44)
- Agnes de Mille, Carousel (1944–45)
- Jerome Robbins, Billion Dollar Baby (1945–46)
- Agnes de Mille, Brigadoon (1946–47)
- Jerome Robbins, High Button Shoes (1947–48)
- Gower Champion, Lend an Ear (1948–49)
- Jack Cole, Alive and Kicking (1949–50)
- Jerome Robbins, The King and I (1950–51)
- Robert Alton, Pal Joey (1951–52)
- Jerome Robbins, Two's Company (1952–53)
- Michael Kidd, Can-Can (1953–54)
- Bob Fosse, The Pajama Game (1954–55)

==== Male Dancer ====
- Paul Haakon, Mexican Hayride (1943–44)
- Peter Birch, Carousel (1944–45)
- Ray Bolger, Three to Make Ready (1945–46)
- James Mitchell, Brigadoon (1946–47)
- Harold Lang, Look Ma, I'm Dancin (1947–48)
- Ray Bolger, Where's Charley? (1948–49)
- Jack Cole, Alive and Kicking (1949–50)
- Harold Lang, Make a Wish (1950–51)
- Harold Lang, Pal Joey (1951–52)
- John Brascia, Hazel Flagg (1952–53)
- Jonathan Lucas, The Golden Apple (1953–54)
- Daniel Nagrin, Plain and Fancy (1954–55)

==== Female Dancer ====
- Sono Osato, One Touch of Venus (1943–44)
- Bambi Linn, Carousel (1944–45)
- Joan McCracken, Billion Dollar Baby (1945–46)
- Anita Alvarez, Finian's Rainbow (1946–47)
- Valerie Bettis, Inside U.S.A. (1947–48)
- Viola Essen, Along Fifth Avenue (1948–49)
- Anita Alvarez, Gentlemen Prefer Blondes (1949–50)
- Janet Collins, Out of This World (1950–51)
- Gemze de Lappe, Paint Your Wagon (1951–52)
- Nora Kaye, Two's Company (1952–53)
- Gwen Verdon, Can-Can (1953–54)
- Carol Haney, The Pajama Game (1954–55)

==== Book (musical) ====
- Oscar Hammerstein II, Carmen Jones (1943–44)
- Oscar Hammerstein II, Carousel (1944–45)
- Oscar Hammerstein II, Show Boat (1945–46)
- Yip Harburg (as E.Y. Harburg) and Fred Saidy, Finian's Rainbow (1946–47)
- Oscar Hammerstein II, Allegro (1947–48)
- Oscar Hammerstein II and Joshua Logan, South Pacific (1948–49)
- Gian Carlo Menotti, The Consul (1949–50)
- Abe Burrows and Jo Swerling, Guys and Dolls (1950–51)
- John O'Hara, Pal Joey (1951–52)
- Joseph Fields and Jerome Chodorov, Wonderful Town (1952–53)
- John La Touche, The Golden Apple (1953–54)
- George Abbott and Richard Bissell, The Pajama Game (1954–55)

==== Lyrics (musical) ====
- Oscar Hammerstein II, Carmen Jones (1943–44)
- Oscar Hammerstein II, Carousel (1944–45)
- Oscar Hammerstein II, Show Boat (1945–46)
- Irving Berlin, Annie Get Your Gun (1946–47)
- Oscar Hammerstein II, Allegro (1947–48)
- Oscar Hammerstein II, South Pacific (1948–49)
- Gian Carlo Menotti, The Consul (1949–50)
- Frank Loesser, Guys and Dolls (1950–51)
- Lorenz Hart, Pal Joey (1951–52)
- Betty Comden and Adolph Green, Wonderful Town (1952–53)
- John La Touche, The Golden Apple (1953–54)
- Richard Adler and Jerry Ross, The Pajama Game (1954–55)

==== Score (musical) ====
- Georges Bizet, Carmen Jones (1943–44)
- Richard Rodgers, Carousel (1944–45)
- Jerome Kern, Show Boat (1945–46)
- Irving Berlin, Annie Get Your Gun (1946–47)
- Richard Rodgers, Allegro (1947–48)
- Richard Rodgers, South Pacific (1948–49)
- Gian Carlo Menotti, The Consul (1949–50)
- Frank Loesser, Guys and Dolls (1950–51)
- Richard Rodgers, Pal Joey (1951–52)
- Leonard Bernstein, Wonderful Town (1952–53)
- Alexander Borodin, Kismet (1953–54)
- Richard Adler and Jerry Ross, The Pajama Game (1954–55)

==== Settings (musical) ====
- Howard Bay, Carmen Jones (1943–44)
- Howard Bay, Up in Central Park (1944–45)
- Robert Edmond Jones, Lute Song (1945–46)
- Oliver Smith, Brigadoon (1946–47)
- Oliver Smith, High Button Shoes (1947–48)
- Lemuel Ayers, Kiss Me, Kate (1948–49)
- Oliver Smith, Gentlemen Prefer Blondes (1949–50)
- Jo Mielziner, The King and I (1950–51)
- Oliver Smith, Pal Joey (1951–52)
- Raoul Pene Du Bois, Wonderful Town (1952–53)
- William and Jean Eckart, The Golden Apple (1953–54)
- Oliver Messel, House of Flowers (1954–55)

==== Costumes (musical) ====
- Raoul Pene Du Bois, Carmen Jones (1943–44)
- Miles White, Bloomer Girl (1944–45)
- Robert Edmond Jones, Lute Song (1945–46)
- David Ffolkes, Brigadoon (1946–47)
- Miles White, High Button Shoes (1947–48)
- Lemuel Ayers, Kiss Me, Kate (1948–49)
- Miles White, Gentlemen Prefer Blondes (1949–50)
- Irene Sharaff, The King and I (1950–51)
- Miles White, Pal Joey (1951–52)
- Lemuel Ayers, My Darlin' Aida (1952–53)
- Lemuel Ayers, Kismet (1953–54)
- Oliver Messel, House of Flowers (1954–55)

== See also ==
- List of theatre awards
