= Wilbur Evans =

American opera singer (1905–1987)

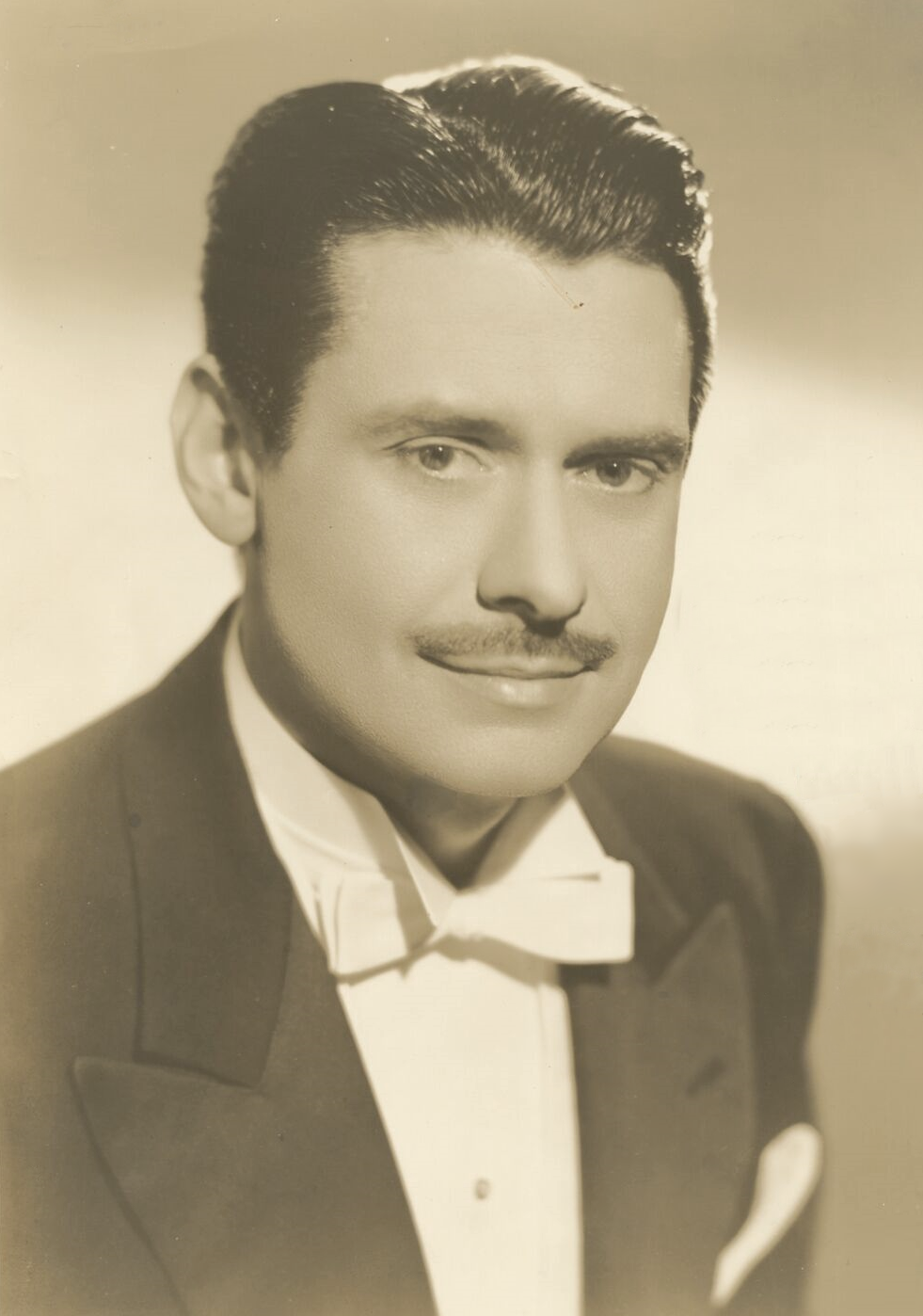
- Evans pictured in 1941
- Born: Wilbur Whilt Evans; August 5, 1905; Philadelphia, Pennsylvania
- Died: May 31, 1987 (aged 81); Mullica Hill, New Jersey
- Occupations: Actor, singer
- Spouse(s): Florence Monroe Evans (before 1946) Susanna Foster (m. 1948–1956) Masako Ogura (m. 1974–1987)

Wilbur Whilt "Wib" Evans (August 5, 1905 – May 31, 1987) was an American actor and singer who performed on the radio, in opera, on Broadway in films and early live television.

Born in Philadelphia, he rose to prominence after winning a national radio singing contest in the 1920s and went on to perform across the U.S. and Canada in concerts, operettas and oratorios. He gained acclaim for his roles in Gilbert and Sullivan productions with Philadelphia's Savoy Company and later became a Broadway regular, starring in The Merry Widow, South Pacific and Man of La Mancha. Known for his operatic voice, Evans also toured internationally and continued performing into the 1960s.

His personal life included four marriages, one of them to actress Susanna Foster, with whom he had two children. He died in New Jersey at the age of 81.

== Early life ==
Evans was born in Philadelphia on August 5, 1905 to parents Walter Percy and Emma Whilt Evans, of Welsh descent. He had a brother, Walter, and a sister, Emma, who died at an early age. As a child, he sang with the Welsh Singing Society of Philadelphia and as a soloist in the choir of the First Unitarian Church in Germantown, aged 5. His first stage appearance came at Holmes Junior High School in a production of Daddy Long Legs.

From 1921 to 1925, he attended West Philadelphia High School for Boys, where he starred as Ko-Ko in The Mikado by Gilbert and Sullivan.

=== Education and early recognition ===
After graduating from high school, Evans earned a two-year scholarship at the prestigious Curtis Institute of Music. During his second year at Curtis, in 1927, he entered the first national radio singing contest, the Atwater Kent Foundation National Radio Singing Contest. Out of 50,000 contestants, Evans won the top male prize of $5,000 in cash and a two-year scholarship for his junior and senior years at Curtis. Some have since referred to Evans as one of the 'first American Idols.'

== Radio and touring career ==
A baritone, Evans performed in radio early his career. In 1930, he moved to Los Angeles to perform on the radio, in concerts and to try his hand has a performer in the movie-talkie fever that was sweeping the land. However, with limited financial success, he returned to New York in 1931 to resume his radio career. He signed with the Columbia Concert Management Agency and its subsidiary, the Cooperative-Community Concerts Bureau, which organized concert tours across the U.S. and Canada. These concerts were typically promoted by local cultural leaders and brought classical music to regional audiences.

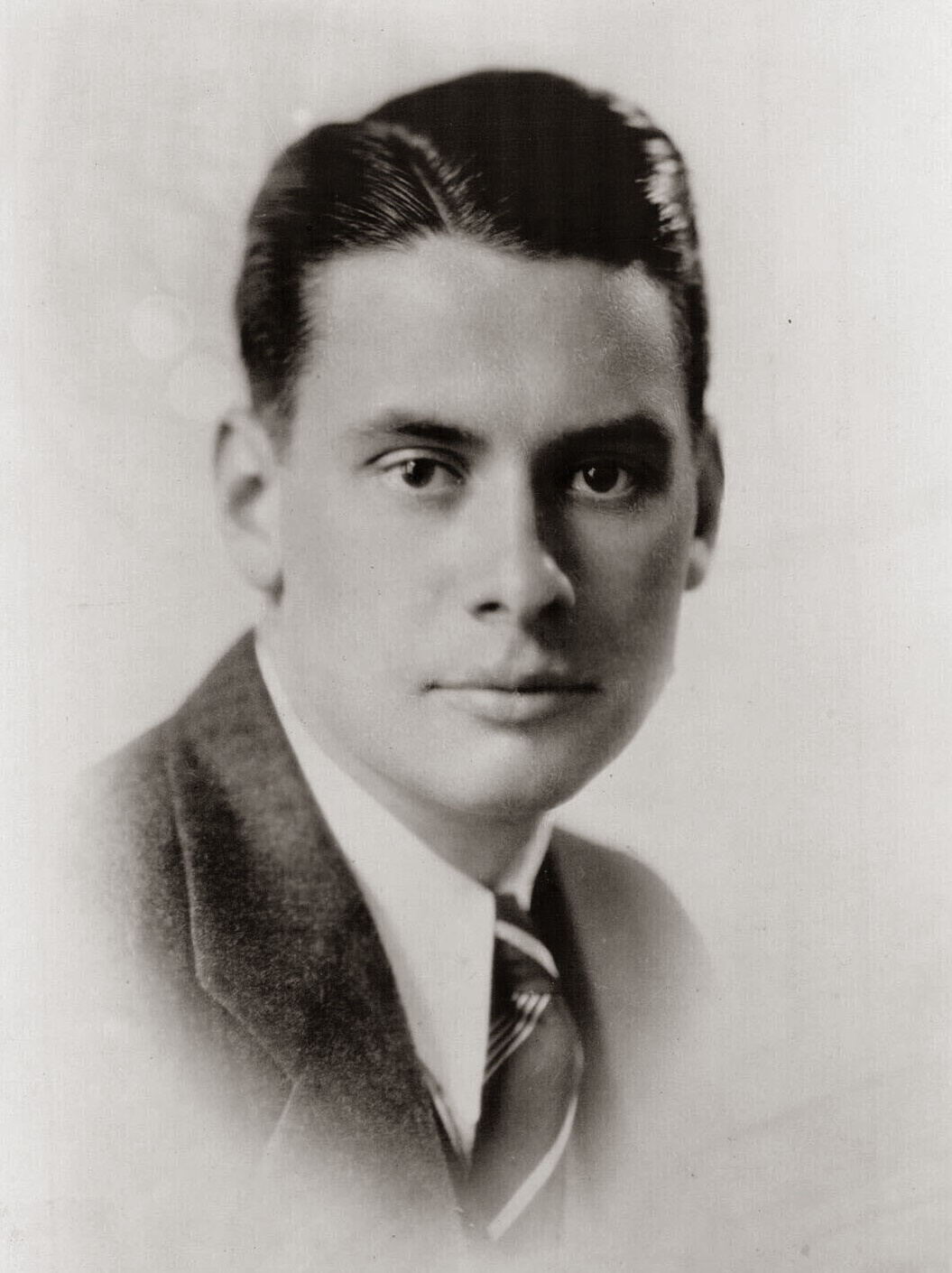
Evans pictured in 1930

=== Gilbert and Sullivan performances ===
Evans found success in Gilbert and Sullivan operettas. On May 22 and 23, 1931, he performed as the Pirate King in The Pirates of Penzance with Philadelphia's Savoy Company at the Academy of Music, earning excellent reviews. The Savoy Company, founded in 1901, is the world's oldest theatrical group dedicated to Gilbert and Sullivan's works.

He returned to the Savoy stage on May 13 and 14, 1932, playing Jack Point in The Yeomen of the Guard, also at the Academy of Music in Philadelphia. He credited his performance in this demanding role to director Pacie Ripple, who had appeared in D'Oyly Carte productions under Gilbert and Sullivan themselves. His duet with Savoy veteran John Steele Williams became a showstopper due to the audience's overwhelming applause.

Evans made his final Savoy appearance in 1936, starring in Utopia, Limited, marking both Savoy's and Philadelphia's premiere of the opera. Once again directed by Pacie Ripple, Evans received rave reviews from local press.

== Operatic and stage career ==
Evans toured widely across North America, performing in concerts, operas, recitals and oratorios; he toured every state except North Dakota. He made his grand opera debut in 1933 in Tristan und Isolde with Fritz Reiner and the Philadelphia Symphony Orchestra.

He served for two years in the Marine Reserve during the 1930s. In 1942, he made his New York debut in The Merry Widow at Carnegie Hall and later made his Broadway debut in Mexican Hayride. He subsequently went on to perform in The New Moon, La Vie Parisienne and Up in Central Park. He made his directional debut at the Lambertville Music Circus in 1949.

=== Late career ===
In 1951, Evans co-starred with Mary Martin in the original London production of South Pacific at the Theatre Royal, Drury Lane. In the early 1950s, Evans and his wife, actress Susanna Foster, toured extensively in operettas and musicals. He appeared in By the Beautiful Sea on Broadway in 1954, and his last role on Broadway was in Man of La Mancha (1965). He frequently returned to perform in Philadelphia and became director of the Valley Forge Music Fair in 1955. Through the 1950s and 1960s, he also performed in concerts and cabarets, singing alongside stars including Mary Martin and Shirley Booth. He also appeared in Man of La Mancha at the Mastbaum Theater in Philadelphia in 1966.

== Later life ==
In the 1960s Evans taught course in light opera and musical theatre at the Academy of Vocal Arts in Philadelphia. Between 1967 and 1971, he served as an Army officer responsible for overseeing United Service Organizations shows in Vietnam. After returning to the U.S. in 1971, he was appointed head of the music and theater division at Fort Bliss, Texas, a position he held until his retirement from the Army in 1974.

== Personal life ==
Evans was married four times. His marriage to his first wife, Florence Monroe Evans, lasted until their divorce in June 1946. In October 1948, he married actress Susanna Foster, with whom he had two children, Philip and Michael. They separated in 1955 when she left Evans, taking her children with her and got divorced in 1956, although reports in 1957 suggested she hoped to reconcile. By 1962, Evans was seeking custody of his two sons, then aged 9 and 11, and alleged that Foster was an unfit mother who lived in a neighbourhood which was "notoriously crime-ridden". His fourth wife was the former Masako Ogura, whom he married in February 1974.

Evans died at his home in Mullica Hill, New Jersey at the age of 81 and was survived by his wife and son, Michael. Other sources suggest he died at Elmer Community Hospital.

== Musicals ==
- The Merry Widow (1942 revival)
- The New Moon (1942 revival)
- La Vie Parisienne (1942 revival)
- Mexican Hayride (1944)
- Up in Central Park (1945)
- South Pacific (1951 London production)
- By the Beautiful Sea (1954)
- Man of La Mancha (1965)

== Films ==
- Her First Romance (1940)
- The Million Pound Note (1953)

== Musical Recordings ==
- The Desert Song (Decca Records, 1944) with Kitty Carlisle and Felix Knight
- The Red Mill (Decca, 1945) with Eileen Farrell and Felix Knight

== Television ==
- Musical Comedy Time
  - The Chocolate Soldier (1950)
  - The Merry Widow (1950)
- Alma Cogin Spectacular - (1959 live show)
  - Singing 6 songs during a 10 minute spot
- Lost in Space
  - The Keeper (Part I) (1966)
  - The Keeper (Part II) (1966)
