= At Home Abroad =

1935 revue with music by Arthur Schwartz and lyrics by Howard Dietz

- A Musical Holiday
- Cast Recording
- Music: Arthur Schwartz
- Lyrics: Howard Dietz
- Productions: 1935 Broadway

At Home Abroad is a revue with music by Arthur Schwartz and lyrics by Howard Dietz. It introduced the songs "Love Is a Dancing Thing", "What a Wonderful World" and "Got a Bran' New Suit", among others. The revue follows a bored couple who flee America and go on a musical world tour.

== Productions ==
The original Broadway production opened at the Winter Garden Theatre on September 19, 1935, and ran for 198 performances. It featured in the cast Beatrice Lillie, Ethel Waters, Herb Williams, Eleanor Powell, Paul Haakon, Reginald Gardiner, Eddie Foy Jr., Vera Allen, and John Payne . Sketches were scripted by Raymond Knight, Marc Connelly and others. The revue was produced by Messrs. Shubert, and directed by Vincente Minnelli and Thomas Mitchell; the first Broadway musical to be directed by Minnelli.

== Synopsis ==
The setting is a cruise around the world, featuring 25 musical numbers at various locations: a London store, an African jungle ("Hottentot Potentate"), a Balkan country where Powell taps spy messages, and a West Indies dockside for "Loadin' Time", to mention a few. The revue gave Bea Lillie the range of a variety of exotic locations. She had the tongue-twister lines "two dozen double damask dinner napkins"; became a Russian ballerina who could not "face the mujik"; and disrupted the line of geisha girls with "It's better with your shoes off" in a Japanese garden. In "Paree", she was a Parisian grisette in the Moulin Rouge in Paris, and "made something of a carnival of this song, with lyrics like 'I want to kiss your right bank, kiss your left bank; kiss Montparnasse' with the emphasis on the last syllable."

== Musical numbers ==
- Get Away From it All
- The Survey
- Dinner Napkins - Eddie Foy Jr, James McColl
- Hottentot Potentate - Ethel Waters
- Paree - Beatrice Lillie
- Thief in the Night - Ethel Waters
- Love Is a Dancing Thing - Paul Haakon, Woods Miller, Nina Whitney
- Loadin' Time - Ethel Waters
- Trains - Reginald Gardiner
- What a Wonderful World - Eleanor Powell
- You May Be Far Away From Me - Beatrice Lillie, Reginald Gardiner
- The Steamboat Whistle - Ethel Waters
- Get Yourself a Geisha
- Got a Bran' New Suit - Eleanor Powell, Ethel Waters
- That's Not Cricket
- The Lady With the Tap - Eleanor Powell, Woods Miller
- Farewell, my lovely - Paul Haakon, Woods Miller, Nina Whitney
