= Stephen Longstreet =

American writer and artist

Stephen Longstreet (April 18, 1907 – February 20, 2002) was an American writer and artist.

== Biography ==
Born Chauncey (later Henri) Weiner (sometimes Wiener), a last name shortened from the family name of Weiner-Longstrasse, he was known as Stephen Longstreet from 1939. He wrote as Paul Haggard, David Ormsbee and Thomas Burton, and Longstreet, as well as Henri Weiner, Stephen Weiner-Longstreet, and Philip Wiener.

Longstreet was born in New York City, and grew up in New Brunswick, New Jersey. He attended the New York School of Fine and Applied Arts in the late 1920s, and then studied art in Paris. He returned to the United States in 1930, travelling to New Orleans where he drew and painted portraits of the jazz scene there. He married Ethel Godoff in 1935, and they had two children.

Although his artwork was considered "too modern" to sell, he was able to establish a career as a magazine artist and cartoonist, and his work was published in magazines including the New Yorker, Life, Vanity Fair, Colliers and the Saturday Evening Post.

The 1948 Broadway musical High Button Shoes was based on Longstreet's semi-autobiographical 1946 novel, The Sisters Liked Them Handsome.

Under contract at Warner Bros. Pictures in the 1940s, Longstreet co-wrote The Jolson Story and Stallion Road, based on his novel of the same name and starring Ronald Reagan. He later collaborated on the script of The Helen Morgan Story, and as a television writer in the 1950s and 1960s he wrote for Playhouse 90.

Longstreet's book, Nell Kimball: Her Life as an American Madam, by herself, is a hoax biography that was partly plagiarized from the works of Herbert Asbury, as was his novel The Wilder Shore from Asbury's The Barbary Coast.

Longstreet's nonfiction works include San Francisco, '49 to '06 and Chicago: 1860 to 1920, as well as A Century on Wheels, The Story of Studebaker and a cookbook, The Joys of Jewish Cooking, that he wrote with his wife Ethel.

The world of jazz was a constant theme throughout Longstreet's life. A number of his books dealt with jazz, Including Jazz From A to Z: A Graphic Dictionary, his 100th book, published in 1989.

He died on February 20, 2002.

== Bibliography ==
Fiction (incomplete list)

- The Pedlocks (1951)
- The Lion at Morning (1954)
- The Beach House (1953)
- Man of Montmartre (1958)
- Geisha (1960)
- Wild Harvest (1960)
- Living High (1962)
- Remember William Kite?
- Pedlock and Sons (1966)
- The Young Men of Paris
- Pedlock Saint, Pedlock Sinner (1951)
- The Last Man Comes Home (1942)
- The Land I Live (1943)
- The Sisters Liked Them Handsome (1946)
- The Promoters (1957)
- She Walks in Beauty (1970)

Plays

- High Button Shoes, A Period comedy in Two Acts (1949)

Nonfiction

- The Boy in the Model-T (1956)
- The Real Jazz, Old and New (1956; reprint 1969)
- A Treasury of the World's Great Prints (1961)
- The Wilder Shore; A Gala Social History of San Francisco's Sinners and Spenders, 1849-1906 (1968)
- with Ethel Longstreet: A Salute to American Cooking (1968)
- The Canvas Falcons: The Story of the Men and Planes of World War I (1970)
- Nell Kimball: Her Life as an American Madam, by herself (1970) Fiction published as nonfiction.
- We All Went to Paris: Americans in the City of Light, 1776-1971 (1972)
- Chicago, 1860-1919 (1973)
- with Ethel Longstreet: The Joys of Jewish Cooking (1974)
- Win or Lose: A Social History of Gambling in America (1977)
