= Richard Lewine =

American composer

- Born: July 28, 1910; New York City, New York
- Origin: New York City, New York
- Died: May 19, 2005 (aged 94) Manhattan, New York
- Occupation(s): Composer, songwriter, television producer

Richard Lewine (July 28, 1910 – May 19, 2005) was an American composer and songwriter on Broadway as well as television producer.

== Biography ==
=== Career ===
Born in New York City, Lewine attended Columbia College before beginning his career as a composer and songwriter. In 1934, he wrote songs for the Broadway revue Fools Rush In. During World War II, Lewine served in the U.S. Army Signal Corps. After the war, he wrote the music for the revue "Make Mine Manhattan" (1948). In the 1950s and 1960s, Lewine produced musicals for television including Cinderella starring Julie Andrews and Aladdin featuring music by Cole Porter. In 1963, he composed the music for the ABC television series Hootenanny. Lewine also produced the Young People's Concerts telecasts on CBS and, in 1965, won an Emmy Award for producing the television special My Name Is Barbra starring Barbra Streisand. After fellow composer Richard Rodgers' death in 1979, Lewine was the managing director of the Rodgers and Hammerstein Organization.

=== Personal life and death ===
Lewine was married twice; he married first wife Mary Haas in 1945 with whom he had two children, Cornelia and Peter. After Haas' death in 1968, Lewine married Elizabeth Rivers.

On May 19, 2005, Lewine died of natural causes at his home in Manhattan.
