= The Stronger Vow =

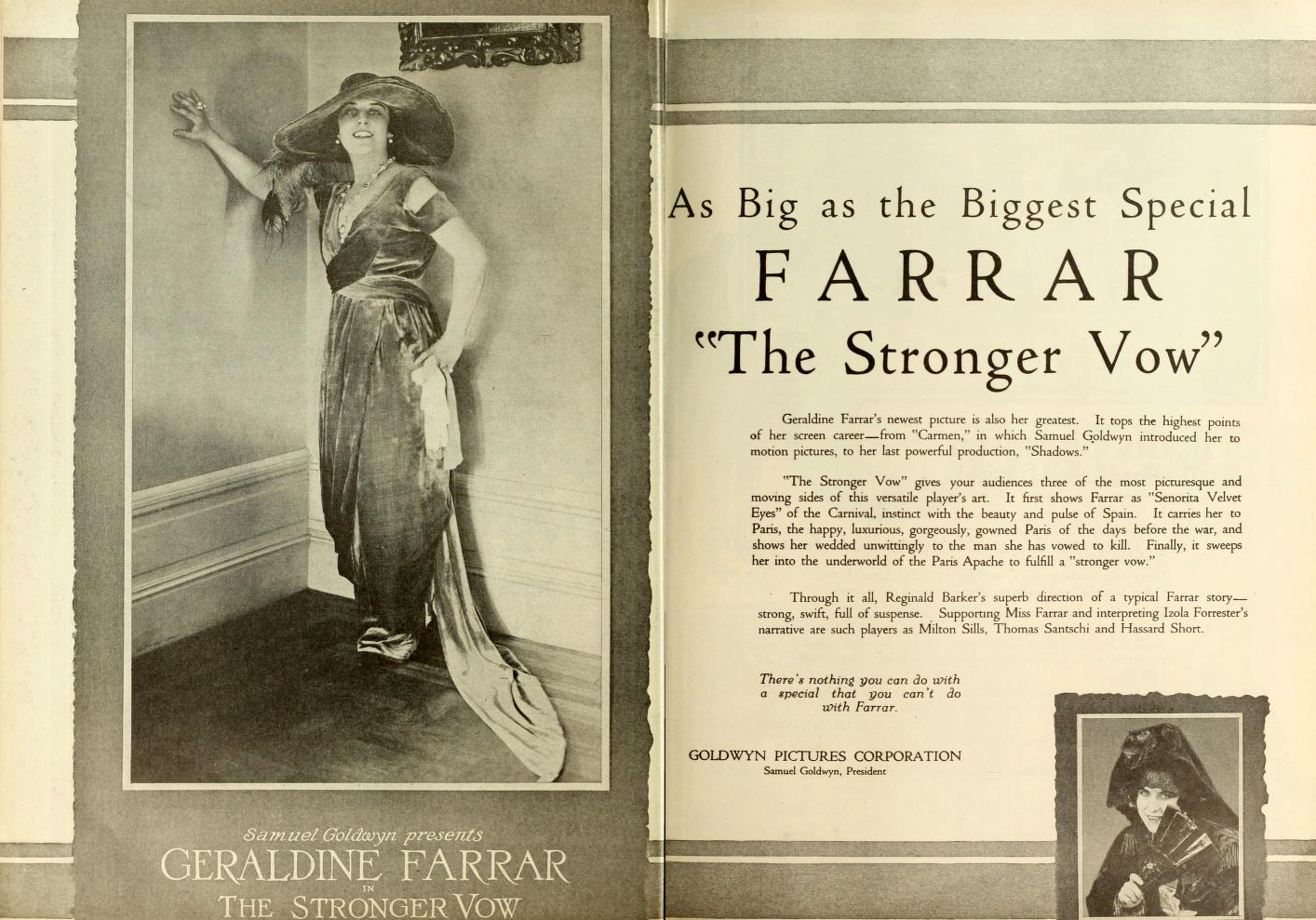
- Ad featuring Geraldine Farrar
- Directed by: Reginald Barker
- Written by: Izola Forrester
- Produced by: Samuel Goldwyn
- Starring: Geraldine Farrar
- Cinematography: Percy Hilburn (French)
- Distributed by: Goldwyn Pictures
- Release date: April 27, 1919
- Running time: 6 reels
- Country: United States
- Language: Silent (English intertitles)

The Stronger Vow is a 1919 American silent melodrama film directed by Reginald Barker and distributed by Samuel Goldwyn. It is not known whether the film currently survives.

== Plot ==
As described in a film magazine, the film deals with the "oath of blood" Dolores de Cordova takes when her brother is murdered during a carnival to kill the murderer with her own hand and the vow she later takes upon marrying Juan Estudillo. Dolores believes her cousin Pedro Toral, who is the real murder, when he accuses Juan just after the wedding dinner, because there long had been a feud between the two Spanish families. Pedro insists that she keep her oath of blood and take revenge with her own hand. Pedro takes Dolores from the church where she was praying and takes her to a den of Apaches, whose leader he has become. Pedro sets a trap for the husband, but Juan is connected with the secret police, and arranges for a raid on the Apache den. Juan first goes there alone, and is captured and bound. Pedro demands that Dolores now keep her oath. At this moment the den is raided, and Pedro is killed by a man whom he had wronged and had also confessed in a moment of bravado of being the murderer. This clears Juan of the false accusation and allows Dolores to keep the stronger vow made at the altar.

== Cast ==
- Geraldine Farrar - Dolores de Cordova
- Milton Sills - Juan Estudillo
- Kate Lester - Senora de Cordova
- Tom Santschi - Pedro Toral
- John Davidson - Jose de Cordova
- Hassard Short - Bibo Leroux
