= Miles White =

American costume designer (1914–2000)

- Born: July 27, 1914
- Died: February 17, 2000 (aged 85)
- Occupation: costume designer
- Awards: Donaldson Awards; Tony Awards

Miles E. White (July 27, 1914 – February 17, 2000) was a top costume designer of Broadway musicals for 25 years. He is known in the entertainment industry for his well rendered, prolific, imaginative and witty designs. He won recognition, including four Donaldson Awards and two Tony Awards.

== Career ==
White designed for five movies, and he received Oscar nominations for three of them. These were The Greatest Show on Earth, There's No Business Like Show Business, and Mike Todd's Around the World in 80 Days.

White designed costumes for Rodgers and Hammerstein's first two Broadway hits, Oklahoma! and Carousel, and dozens of other musicals as well as ballets, ice shows, circuses, and TV productions. His costume designs for the Ice Capades of 1965 (along with Billy Livingston and Celine Faur) were noted: "And those beautiful costumes are the efforts of Miles White, Billy Livingston and Celine Faur." His last Broadway show was Tricks, in 1973, for which he received a Tony nomination. As musicals were revived, the productions occasionally used his designs, and also true for Fall River Legend for the American Ballet Theatre. In 1989, he redesigned the "High Button Shoes" number for Jerome Robbins' Broadway.

Costume designer William Ivey Long referred to Miles White as "his hero," in a recording made of the March 20, 2000, memorial service at the York Theater. In this audio recording, he also cited White's "exquisite drawings," works of art in themselves, in addition to their role as working design sketches.

Douglas Colby, expert on theater design, tells the story of accompanying White to a performance of Fall River Legend several years ago. He said, "The distinguished costume designer Patricia Zipprodt approached the urbane, monocled gentleman I was accompanying, my friend Miles White, and introduced him to her guests as 'God.' One understood what she meant," Colby concluded. This information appears in the Playbill booklet distributed at the March 20, 2000 Memorial Service.

As reported in The New York Times, Mary C. Henderson in her book Theater in America, mentioned that Miles White's designs were inspired by the dance and the circus. "His costumes are constructed to move with the performer's body, not an easy feat," she wrote. After Oklahoma!, she noted, he dominated musical comedy costuming for more than 25 years."

White died on February 17, 2000.

== Personal life ==
White was the uncle of New York jazz singer Carla White.

== Work ==
Source for Broadway productions:Playbill Vault

- 1938: Paradise Clue
- 1938: Right This Way (Broadway Debut)
- 1938: You Never Know
- 1939: Copacabana
- 1939: Walton Roof (Philadelphia)
- 1939: Versailles Supper Club
- 1940: It Happened On Ice
- 1941: Best Foot Forward
- 1941: Ringling Bros. and Barnum & Bailey Circus
- 1942: The Pirate
- 1942: Ringling Bros. and Barnum & Bailey Circus
- 1943: Ziegfeld Follies
- 1943: Early to Bed
- 1943: Get Away Old Man
- 1943: Oklahoma!
- 1944: Up In Arms (film)
- 1944: Dream with Music
- 1944: Billy Rose's Diamond Horseshoe
- 1944: Bloomer Girl
- 1945: Carousel
- 1945: The Day Before Spring
- 1946: Gypsy Lady
- 1946: The Duchess of Malfi
- 1946: The Kid From Brooklyn (film)
- 1947: Ringling Bros. and Barnum & Bailey Circus
- 1947: High Button Shoes (original designs)
- 1947: Bloomer Girl (original designs)
- 1948: Fall River Legend
- 1948: Ringling Bros. and Barnum & Bailey Circus
- 1949: Carousel (original designs)
- 1949: Gentlemen Prefer Blondes
- 1949: Ringling Bros. and Barnum & Bailey Circus
- 1950: Bless You All (Tony Award)
- 1951: Ringling Bros. and Barnum & Bailey Circus
- 1951: Oklahoma! (original designs)
- 1951: Ringling Bros. and Barnum & Bailey Circus
- 1952: The Greatest Show on Earth (film)
- 1952: Ringling Bros. and Barnum & Bailey Circus
- 1952: Pal Joey
- 1952: Three Wishes For Jamie
- 1952: Two's Company
- 1953: Oklahoma! (original designs)
- 1953: Hazel Flagg (Tony Award)
- 1953: Ringling Bros. and Barnum & Bailey Circus
- 1954: The Girl in Pink Tights
- 1954: There's No Business Like Show Business (film)
- 1954: Ringling Bros. and Barnum & Bailey Circus
- 1955: Ankles Aweigh
- 1955: Ringling Bros. and Barnum & Bailey Circus
- 1955: Strip For Action (Closed prior to NY)
- 1956: Around the World in Eighty Days
- 1957: Eugenia
- 1957: Ringling Bros. and Barnum & Bailey Circus
- 1957: Time Remembered
- 1957: Jamaica
- 1957: The Carefree Heart
- 1958: Tristan
- 1958: Oh, Captain!
- 1959: Cheri
- 1959: Take Me Along
- 1959: Show Business (Carol Channing on tour)
- 1960: Bye Bye Birdie
- 1960: The Unsinkable Molly Brown
- 1961: Show Girl
- 1961: Milk And Honey
- 1962: Song of Norway (on tour)
- 1963: Zenda
- 1966: Ice Capades
- 1969: 1491
- 1969: Oklahoma! (original designs)
- 1970: Candida
- 1971: A Day In The Life Of Just About Everyone
- 1972: A Quarter For The Ladies Room
- 1973: Tricks
- 1976: Best Friend
- 1977: The Ice Show
- 1980: Changes
- 1989: Jerome Robbins' Broadway ("High Button Shoes" segment)
