= Up in Central Park (film) =

1948 film by William A. Seiter

- Theatrical release poster
- Directed by: William A. Seiter
- Screenplay by: Karl Tunberg
- Based on: Up in Central Park (play) by Herbert Fields
- Produced by: Karl Tunberg
- Starring: Deanna Durbin; Dick Haymes; Vincent Price
- Cinematography: Milton R. Krasner
- Edited by: Otto Ludwig
- Production company: Universal Pictures
- Distributed by: Universal Pictures
- Release dates: March 5, 1948 (Los Angeles-Premiere); May 26, 1948 (United States)
- Running time: 84 minutes
- Country: United States
- Language: English
- Budget: $2 million

Up in Central Park is a 1948 American musical comedy film directed by William A. Seiter and starring Deanna Durbin, Dick Haymes and Vincent Price. Based on the play Up in Central Park by Herbert Fields with a screenplay by Karl Tunberg, the film is about a newspaper reporter and the daughter of an immigrant maintenance man who help expose political corruption in New York City in the 1870s.

== Plot ==
In New York City in the 1870s, as the city prepares for the upcoming election, corrupt political boss William Tweed and his Tammany Hall political machine are working hard to re-elect their candidates, including Mayor Oakley, in order to continue exploiting the coffers of the city and state. The one voice opposing Boss Tweed's organization is John Matthews, a young naïve reporter for The New York Times.

When Irish immigrant Timothy Moore and his singing daughter Rosie arrive in New York City hoping for a better life, they are set upon immediately by Rogan, one of Boss Tweed's men. The illiterate Timothy agrees to vote twenty-three times for the Tammany ticket, and is rewarded with $50 and an invitation to Boss Tweed's victory party. At the party, Rosie inadvertently overhears Boss Tweed's latest plan to embezzle the city's coffers through the unnecessary renovation of Central Park. Fearing that Rosie may know about his plan, Boss Tweed appoints the unknowing Timothy to the post of Park Superintendent.

Sometime later, John meets Timothy, the new Park Superintendent. Unaware that John is a reporter, Timothy reveals that some of the park's zoo animals are actually being raised for Boss Tweed's consumption. After John's story appears in the paper, Timothy is fired, but when Rosie appeals to an infatuated Boss Tweed to give her father another chance, he agrees. Also smitten with Rosie, John offers Timothy a job with his newspaper. Soon after, John tries to convince Rosie of Boss Tweed's dishonesty, but is unsuccessful. Later that night, Rosie almost discovers Boss Tweed's true character when he makes numerous, lecherous advances toward her during dinner, but is interrupted by Timothy, who mistakenly believes that he was invited.

After Rosie arranges a meeting between John and Boss Tweed, the political boss offers to sponsor John's proposed novel if he agrees to quit his job at The New York Times. John refuses the bribe. Later, John discovers Timothy attending grammar school classes; with the help of a schoolteacher named Miss Murch, the old man learns of Boss Tweed's corruption. When Timothy tries to tell his daughter about Boss Tweed's true character, she refuses to listen, having become romantically involved with the married man.

Through Boss Tweed's influence, Rosie soon auditions for an opera company, and though she is offered a role in an upcoming production, Tweed insists that she be cast in the current show. Meanwhile, Timothy, upset over his daughter's involvement with Tweed, approaches John and offers to help him gain evidence against the political boss by breaking into city hall and examining the city's financial records. The two men are discovered by a drunken Mayor Oakley when he wanders into his office, but they trick him into giving his copies of Boss Tweed's financial dealings to the newspaperman.

After their corruption is exposed in the newspapers, Boss Tweed and his associates prepare to flee the country, but Tweed offers no apologies to Rosie for his actions, stating his belief in the rights of the strong over the weak. After he leaves her, Rosie wanders through Central Park, where she is discovered by Timothy and John. After requesting her father's forgiveness, Rosie is reunited with John.

== Cast ==
- Deanna Durbin as Rosie Moore
- Dick Haymes as John Matthews
- Vincent Price as Boss Tweed
- Albert Sharpe as Timothy Moore
- Tom Powers as Rogan
- Hobart Cavanaugh as Mayor Oakley
- Thurston Hall as Governor Motley
- Howard Freeman as Myron Schultz
- Mary Field as Miss Murch
- Tom Pedi as O'Toole
- Moroni Olsen as Big Jim Fitts
- William Skipper as Dancer
- Nellie Fisher as Dancer
- Edward Peil Sr. as Politician (uncredited)

== Production ==
In February 1946, Universal announced they had bought the film rights to the musical as a vehicle for Deanna Durbin. It was to be produced by Felix Jackson. The studio paid $100,000.

In April 1946, Dwight Taylor was assigned to write the script. In October Universal's then head of production William Dozier said he wanted Fred Astaire to direct the film which was going to be made in Technicolor in January 1947. "This depends a lot on how Fred can arrange his other business interests," said Dozier. "I know Fred is anxious to do it but since we plan it as a big production it needs plenty of time and preparation. Astaire has been in lots of pictures, he's intelligent and creative as the dickens, and we think he could and would be the right man for the job."

In November Jackson left Universal and Joseph Sistrom became the producer. Filming was delayed because Technicolor lab would be unable to handle the demands of making the movie for several months (they had been particularly hit hard by a strike). Eventually Sistrom would be assigned to another project and Karl Tunberg would write and produce the movie.

Tunberg changed the names of some characters in the script based on real people in order to avoid legal hassles with their descendants. Mayor A. Oakley Hall was changed to "Oakley", Big Jim Fisk was changed to "Fitz", Governor Hoffman was changed to Governor Morley, Sheriff O'Brien and Controller O'Conner were combined into "Schultz". Tunberg also changed the story from the Broadway musical to focus on two Irish immigrants who come to New York, are originally fans of Tweed, then come to see his corruption.

In March 1947, William Seiter was signed as director. In June Dick Haymes ended his contract with 20th Century Fox and signed a two-picture deal with Universal, one of whom would be the lead in up in Central Park. The following month Vincent Price was cast as Boss Tweed; Noah Beery Snr had played the part on Broadway but the role was reconfigured so Tweed could be a romantic rival for Durbin's character. “I took the part because Fred Astaire was going to direct, but he quit on opening day of filming,” said Vincent Price. “Perhaps he finally read the script.”

In September the role of Durbin's father was given to Albert Sharpe, who had been in Finian's Rainbow on Broadway and was borrowed from RKO. It was his film debut.

Universal merged to become Universal-International. New head of production William Goetz decided to make the film in black and white as it was cheaper and films were taking several months to come back from the Technicolor lab.

Filming started in October 1947. It was shot over 52 days with a budget of $2 million. Helen Tamaris, who choreographed the stage show, and Howard Bay, who did the stage design, both worked on the movie.

=== Soundtrack ===
- "When She Walks in the Room" (Sigmund Romberg and Dorothy Fields)
- "Carousel in the Park" (Sigmund Romberg and Dorothy Fields)
- "Oh Say, Can You See (What I See)" (Sigmund Romberg and Dorothy Fields)
- "Pace, pace mio Dio" from the opera La forza del destino (Giuseppe Verdi, Francesco Maria Piave)

Price signed a contract with a record company to record four of the songs from the musical: "Up in Central Park", "The Boss", "Rip Van Winkle", and "May I Show You My Currier and Ives".

Durbin's third husband Charles David said she "hated" making her last three films and that she would watch all her old movies except those three.

== Reception ==
In his 1948 review in The New York Times, T.M.P. wrote that the film was "somewhat less successful as entertainment than the play." The producers' decision to reduce the number of songs does not help matters.

Gone, too, are most of the songs, a regrettable elimination, since Deanna Durbin is on hand and in extremely good voice. Her introductory number, "Oh! Say Can You See," is a new, if not too sprightly addition; "Carousel in the Park" is old but good, and then there is the classical "Pace, Pace Mio Dio" to complete the vocal range. Miss Durbin's voice is clear and bell-like, but such a limited repertoire is hardly enough to provide her with a decent workout. And Dick Haymes, who sings pleasantly, is restricted to "When She Walks in the Room" and to participating in "Carousel in the Park."

Regarding the casting, the reviewer wrote, "Durbin is fresh looking in a nice girlish way and displays a convincing amount of naïveté, and Mr. Haymes is agreeable enough, though he looks and acts more like a professional juvenile than a seasoned reporter. Albert Sharpe contributes some mil dhumor as Miss Durbin's doting parent." Regarding the casting of Vincent Price in the role of Boss Tweed, the reviewer wrote, "a more inappropriate choice could hardly be imagined." Finally, the film fails to exploit the obvious filming location choices in Central Park, restricting them to a few shots of the zoo, the carousel, and a bit of greenery around the superintendent's house. According to the reviewer, the director should have "moved his camera out onto the meadows instead of focusing so much on plush, stuffy interiors."

In his review for Rovi, Hal Erickson wrote that the best scene of the film was Currier & Ives ballet, one of the few holdovers from the stage version.

== Radio adaptation ==
Up in Central Park was presented on Screen Guild Players June 28, 1948. The 30-minute adaptation starred Durbin and Haymes in their screen roles. Charles Irwin and Willard Waterman were also featured.

== See also ==
- Up in Central Park
- William M. Tweed
- Tammany Hall
