= Woman's Place =

1921 film by Victor Fleming

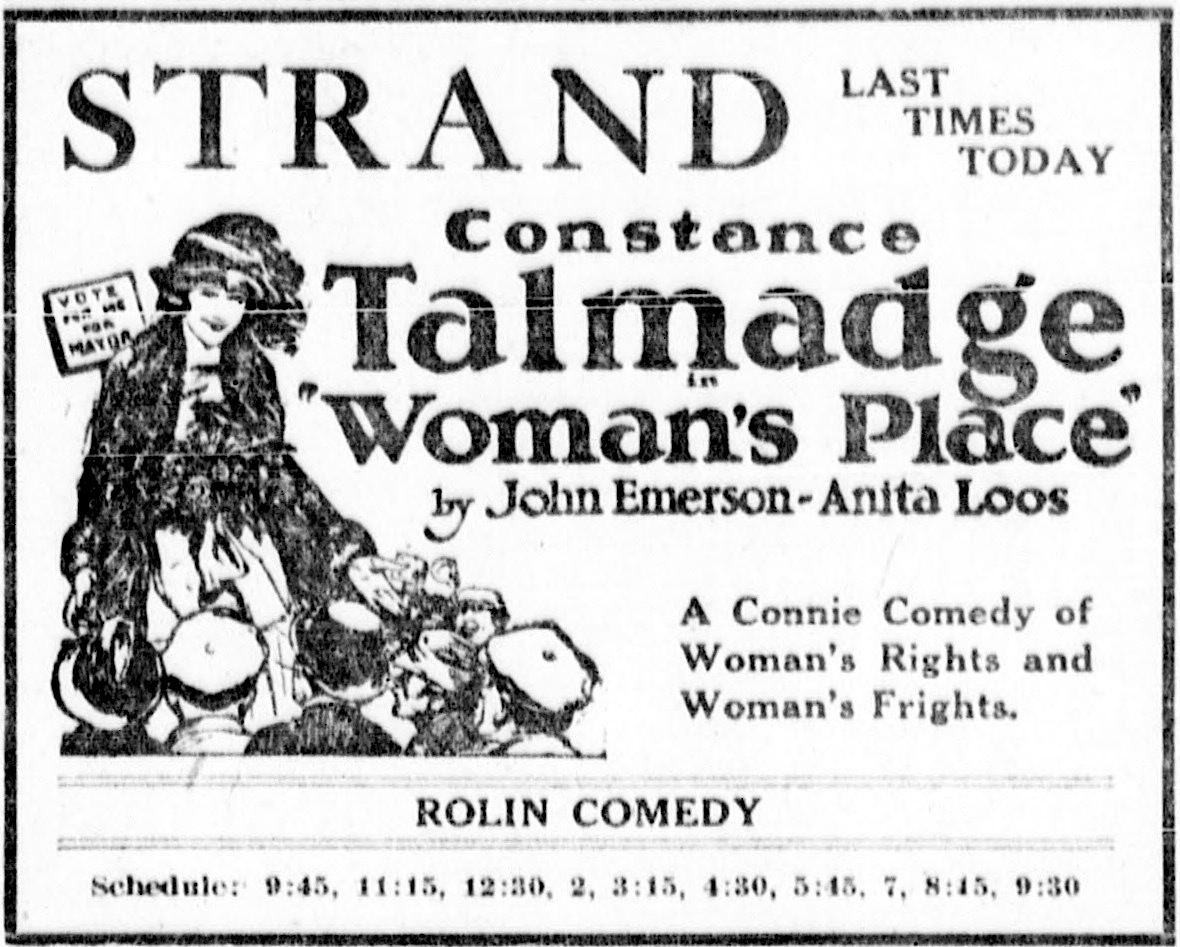
- Newspaper advertisement
- Directed by: Victor Fleming
- Written by: John Emerson; Anita Loos
- Produced by: Joseph M. Schenck
- Starring: Constance Talmadge
- Cinematography: Oliver Marsh; J. Roy Hunt
- Distributed by: Associated First National Pictures (later First National Pictures)
- Release date: October 17, 1921
- Running time: 60 minutes
- Country: United States
- Language: Silent (English intertitles)

Woman's Place is a 1921 American romantic comedy film directed by Victor Fleming. It stars Constance Talmadge and Kenneth Harlan. It was produced by Talmadge's brother-in-law, Joseph Schenck and distributed through Associated First National, later First National Pictures.

It is a surviving film in the British Film Institute (BFI) in London.

== Plot ==
As described in a film magazine, Josephine Gerson is selected by the woman's party as their candidate for mayor and her fiancé accepts the "machine" nomination, and their engagement ends. In her conflict with the boss of the opposition party Jim Bradley, mutual love develops with each determined to win. In an election speech as novel as it is effective, Josephine wins the male voters of the pivotal ninth ward. However, her campaign's neglect of the female vote results in her defeat at the polls by 27 votes. Natural gloom at the loss is dispelled when Bradley announces that he has been won over by her policies and appoints her constituents to vital offices, and a happy ending results.

== Cast ==
- Constance Talmadge as Josephine Gerson
- Kenneth Harlan as Jim Bradley
- Hassard Short as Freddy Bleeker
- Florence Short as Amy Bleeker
- Ina Rorke as Mrs. Margaret Belknap
- Margaret Linden as Miss Jane Wilson (credited as Marguerite Linden)
- Jack Connolly as Dan Dowd
