= Music Box Revue =

Music Box Revue was a series of four musical theatre revues by Irving Berlin, presented from 1921 to 1924 at the Music Box Theatre in New York City. Berlin wrote the book, music, and lyrics to all four editions. The first show was staged by Hassard Short with music by Irving Berlin, and featured contributions from a number of writers including Robert Benchley. it debuted in 1921, where it ran for 440 performances.

== See also ==
- "Mysterioso Pizzicato"

== Sources ==
- Billy Altman, Laughter's Gentle Soul: The Life of Robert Benchley. (New York City: W. W. Norton, 1997. ISBN 0-393-03833-5).
- Internet Broadway Database: Music Box Revue. URL accessed 6 June 2007.
