= Arthur Schwartz =

American composer and film producer (1900–1984)

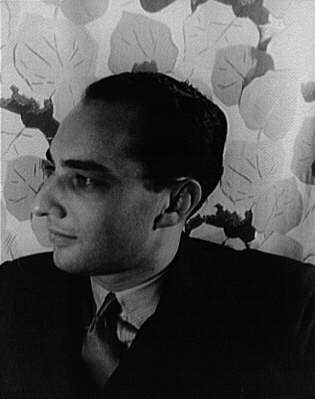
- Arthur Schwartz photo taken by Carl Van Vechten, 1933
- Born: November 25, 1900; Brooklyn, New York City
- Died: September 3, 1984 (aged 83); Kintnersville, Pennsylvania
- Occupations: Composer, film producer

Arthur Schwartz (November 25, 1900 – September 3, 1984) was an American composer and film producer, widely noted for his songwriting collaborations with Howard Dietz.

== Biography ==
=== Early life ===
Schwartz was born to a Jewish family in Brooklyn, New York City, on November 25, 1900. He taught himself to play the harmonica and piano as a child, and began playing for silent films at age 14. He earned a B.A. in English at New York University and an M.A. in Architecture at Columbia. Forced by his father, an attorney, to study law, Schwartz graduated from NYU Law School with a Juris Doctor and was admitted to the bar in 1924.

=== Career ===
While studying law, he supported himself by teaching English in the New York school system. He also worked on songwriting concurrently with his studies and published his first song ("Baltimore, Md., You're the Only Doctor for Me", with lyrics by Eli Dawson) by 1923. Acquaintances such as Lorenz Hart and George Gershwin encouraged him to stick with composing. He attempted to convince Howard Dietz, an MGM publicist who had collaborated with Jerome Kern, to work with him, but Dietz initially declined.

As Artist Direct documents, Schwartz placed his first songs in a Broadway show, The New Yorkers (March 10, 1927). By 1928, he had closed his law office and convinced Dietz to write with him. Their first songs together were used in the Broadway revue The Little Show (April 30, 1929) and included "I Guess I'll Have to Change My Plan", which belatedly became a hit three years later when it was recorded by Rudy Vallée. Schwartz's career was launched, and in 1930 he contributed songs to six shows, three in London and three in New York, the most successful of which was Three's a Crowd (October 15, 1930), which featured the same cast as The Little Show and featured the hit "Something to Remember You By". Schwartz also started contributing songs to motion pictures, beginning with "I'm Afraid of You" (lyrics by Ralph Rainger and Edward Eliscu) in Queen High (1930).

Among other Broadway musicals for which Schwartz wrote the music are: The Band Wagon (1931), A Tree Grows in Brooklyn (1951), By the Beautiful Sea (1954), The Gay Life (1961), and Jennie (1963). His films include the MGM musical The Band Wagon (1953) with lyrics by Dietz. Schwartz and Dietz's music was given tribute in the 1972 Broadway revue That's Entertainment.

Schwartz also worked as a producer, for Columbia Pictures. His work includes the musical Cover Girl (1944) and the Cole Porter biographical film Night and Day (1946).

=== Personal life ===
Schwartz was married to 1930s Broadway ingénue Kay Carrington, until her death when their first son, Jonathan Schwartz (born 1938), was 14. Jonathan worked as a radio personality and sometime musician; he announced he would retire from radio in 2023. Schwartz's younger son, Paul Schwartz (born 1956), with actress/dancer Mary Schwartz, is a composer, conductor, pianist, and producer.

=== Death ===
Arthur Schwartz died September 3, 1984, in Kintnersville, Pennsylvania.

== Awards ==
Schwartz received two Academy Award nominations for Best Song: the first in 1944 for "They're Either Too Young or Too Old" in the film Thank Your Lucky Stars; the second in 1948 for "A Gal in Calico" from the film The Time, the Place and the Girl.

In 1972, Schwartz was inducted into the Songwriters Hall of Fame. In 1981, he was inducted in 1981 into the American Theater Hall of Fame.

In 1990, Schwartz's hit, "That's Entertainment" from the film The Band Wagon, was awarded the ASCAP Award for Most Performed Feature Film Standard.

== Collaborators ==
Schwartz collaborated with some of the best lyricists of his day, including Dietz, Dorothy Fields, Ira Gershwin, Oscar Hammerstein II, Edward Heyman, Frank Loesser, Johnny Mercer, Leo Robin, and Al Stillman.

== Musicals ==
See the section Arthur Schwartz (1900–1984) in List of musicals by composer: M to Z#S.

== Songs ==
The following is a selection of songs composed by Arthur Schwartz.

=== With Howard Dietz ===
- "By Myself", recorded by Rosemary Clooney, Stacey Kent, Julie London, Ann Richards and notably Judy Garland.
- "I Guess I'll Have to Change My Plan", introduced by Clifton Webb in the revue The Little Show (1929)
- "Lucky Seven" (1930)
- "High and Low", performed in The Band Wagon (1931) by John Barker and Roberta Robinson
- "Hoops", introduced in the revue The Band Wagon (1931) by Fred and Adele Astaire
- "Dancing in the Dark", introduced by John Barker in the revue The Band Wagon (1931)
- "I Love Louisa", introduced by Fred and Adele Astaire in the revue The Band Wagon (1931)
- "If There Is Someone Lovelier Than You", recorded by Dick Haymes
- "Alone Together", introduced in the revue Flying Colors (1932), by Jean Sargent
- "Louisiana Hayride", introduced by Tamara Geva, Clifton Webb, and ensemble in the revue Flying Colors (1932)
- "Something to Remember You By", recorded by Morgana King, Irene Kral, and Jo Stafford
- "You and the Night and the Music", from the musical Revenge with Music (1934)
- "Get Yourself a Geisha Girl", from the musical At Home Abroad (1935)
- "Got a Bran' New Suit", introduced by Ethel Waters in the revue At Home Abroad (1935)
- "Love Is a Dancing Thing", from the 1935 revue At Home Abroad (1935)
- "Paree", from the musical At Home Abroad (1935)
- "Confession" (1937), recorded by Judy Holliday
- "I See Your Face Before Me", introduced by Jack Buchanan, Evelyn Laye, and Adele Dixon in the musical Between the Devil (1937) and recorded by Frank Sinatra in his In the Wee Small Hours (1955) album and by Doris Day on her Day by Night (1957) album.
- "Haunted Heart", introduced in the musical Inside U.S.A. (1948) and recorded by Susannah McCorkle.
- "That's Entertainment!", for the film The Band Wagon (1953)
- "Waitin' for the Evening Train", for the musical Jennie (1963)

=== With other lyricists ===
- "After All You're All I'm After" (words by Edward Heyman, 1933)
- "Then I'll Be Tired of You" (words by E. Y. Harburg, 1934); recorded by Fats Waller and Jeri Southern
- "An Old Flame Never Dies" (words by Al Stillman and Laurence Stallings), performed in the operetta Virginia
- "A Lady Needs a Change" (words by Dorothy Fields), performed by Ethel Merman in Stars in Your Eyes (1939)
- "It's All Yours" (words by Dorothy Fields), performed by Jimmy Durante and Ethel Merman in Stars in Your Eyes (1939)
- "'Til You Return" (words by Howard Schwartz), introduced by Claire Trevor in the film Crossroads (1942)
- "I'm Riding for a Fall" (Dennis Morgan and Joan Leslie), "They're Either Too Young or Too Old" (Bette Davis), and "Ice Cold Katy" (Hattie McDaniel, Willie Best, and Jess Lee Brooks) (all to words by Frank Loesser), in the film Thank Your Lucky Stars (1943)
- "A Gal in Calico" (words by Leo Robin), introduced in the film The Time, the Place and the Girl (1946) by Jack Carson, Martha Vickers and Dennis Morgan
- "A Rainy Night in Rio" (words by Leo Robin), introduced in the film The Time, the Place and the Girl (1946) by Dennis Morgan, Jack Carson, Janis Paige, and Martha Vickers
- "Alone Too Long" (words by Dorothy Fields), introduced by Shirley Booth and Wilbur Evans in the musical By the Beautiful Sea (1954)
- "Simpatico" recorded by Dean Martin (April 25, 1955)
