= Hassard Short =

American actor (1877–1956)

- Short in 1907
- Born: 15 October 1877; Edlington, Lincolnshire, UK
- Died: 9 October 1956 (aged 78); Nice, France
- Occupations: Stage director, set designer, lighting designer, actor
- Years active: 1895–1953
- Partner: Billy Ladd

Hubert Edward Hassard Short (15 October 1877 – 9 October 1956), usually known as Hassard Short, was an actor, stage director, set designer and lighting designer in musical theatre who directed over 50 Broadway and West End shows between 1920 and 1953. Theatre historian Ken Bloom called him "one of Broadway's greatest directors and lighting designers", while theatre writer John Kenrick described him as a "groundbreaking director and choreographer".

After 25 years acting on stage and in films, Short turned to directing and designing in 1920. He made many innovations in stage lighting and design, including the first permanent lighting bridge (Music Box Revue, 1921) and first the use of a revolving stage in a Broadway musical (The Band Wagon, 1931). He continued to direct until 1952.

== Early life and acting career ==
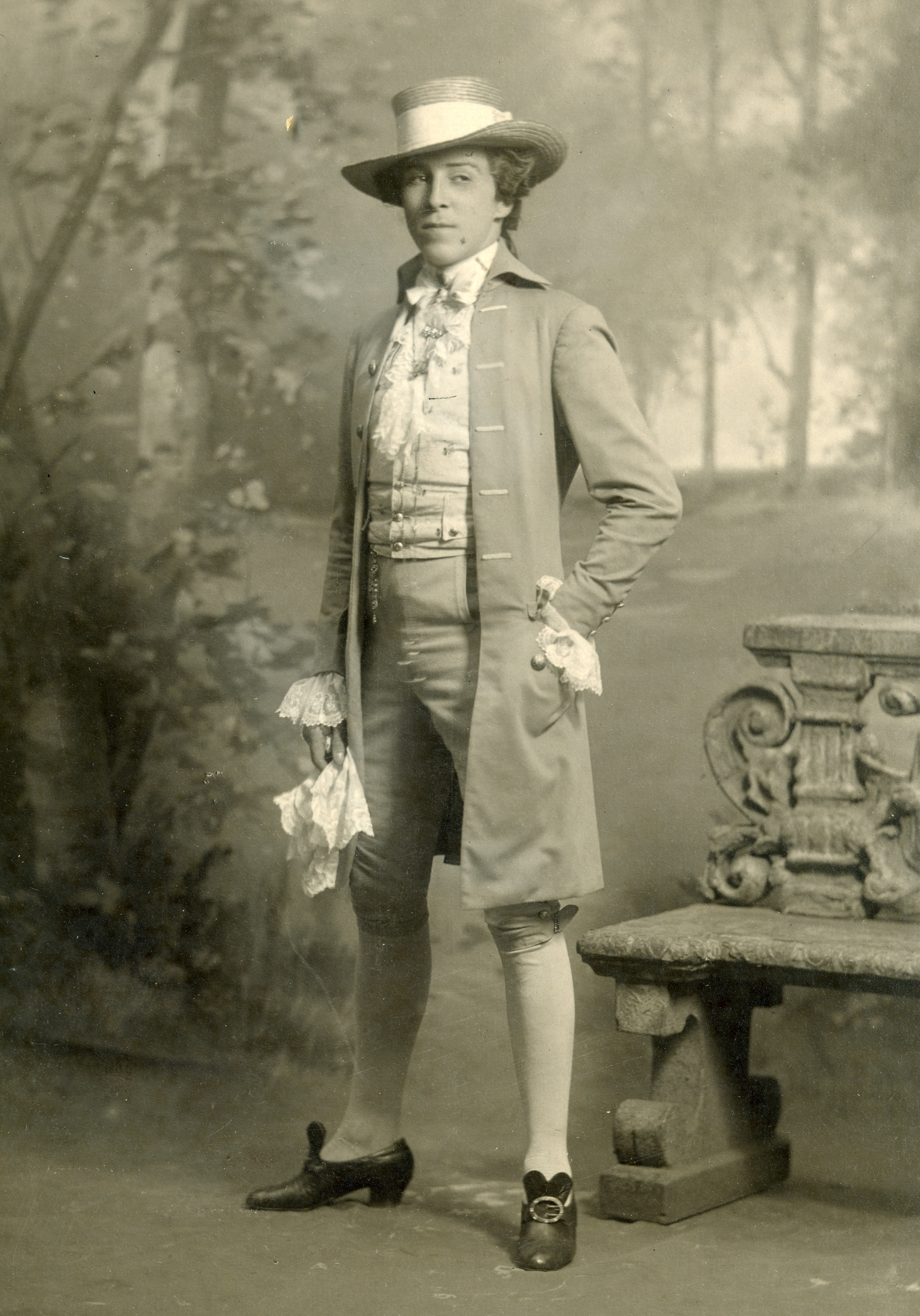
Short in the 1905 Broadway play The Toast of the Town

Short was born in Edlington, Lincolnshire into the English landed gentry, the elder son of Edward Hassard Short and Geraldine Rachel Blagrave. He left school aged fifteen to seek a career on the stage. He made his first acting appearance in London in 1895 before being brought to New York City by producer Charles Frohman in 1901, where he continued to appear on stage until 1919. He also acted in five silent films between 1917 and 1921, the last being Woman's Place.

== Directing and stagecraft career ==
Short's first experience of directing was the 1908 hit Broadway play The Man from Home. Alongside his acting work, he directed The Lambs Club Gambols, annual benefit productions, from 1911 to 1913. During the 1919 Actors' Equity Association strike he staged a series of four all-star fundraising shows, which were so well received that he decided his future lay in directing and stagecraft; a small advertisement in The New York Times in July 1920 announced "his intention of becoming a vaudeville impresario on a large scale", as well as his appointment by producer Joseph Weber as director of the operetta Honeydew. In this production an electrician operated overhead spotlights above the stage from a bosun's chair, the first of Short's many innovations in stage lighting.

His first major hits as a stage director came with the series of Music Box Revues from 1921 to 1923, which showcased Irving Berlin's songs. As well as innovative lighting, he included mechanical effects such as moving stages and elevators, though these were not received with universal approval: the critic Gilbert Seldes complained that "Hassard Short, confusing the dynamics of the theatre with mere hoisting power, moves everything that can be moved except the audience." In 1921 he staged a historic Shakespearean pageant with many of Broadway's leading men and women in a fundraiser for Actor's Equity.

Short adapted well to the more limited budgets of the 1930s by staging revues, including many collaborations with producer Max Gordon and choreographer Albertina Rasch. In Three's a Crowd (1930), he dispensed with footlights for the first time on the New York stage by attaching lights to the balcony railing. He staged the groundbreaking 1931 revue The Band Wagon on double revolving turntables, allowing rapid scene changes. His opulent staging of The Great Waltz (1934), financed by John D. Rockefeller, was an exception to the tightened purse-strings of the time and confounded many critics by becoming a hit in both New York and London.

His wartime hits included Lady in the Dark (1941), Something for the Boys (1943) and Carmen Jones (1943), for which he won the first Donaldson Award for best musical direction. Short continued to work into his seventies: he staged a successful revival of Show Boat in 1948, and staged and did the lighting for the revue, Make Mine Manhattan (1948). The last show he worked on was My Darlin' Aida, which opened in 1952.

== Private life ==
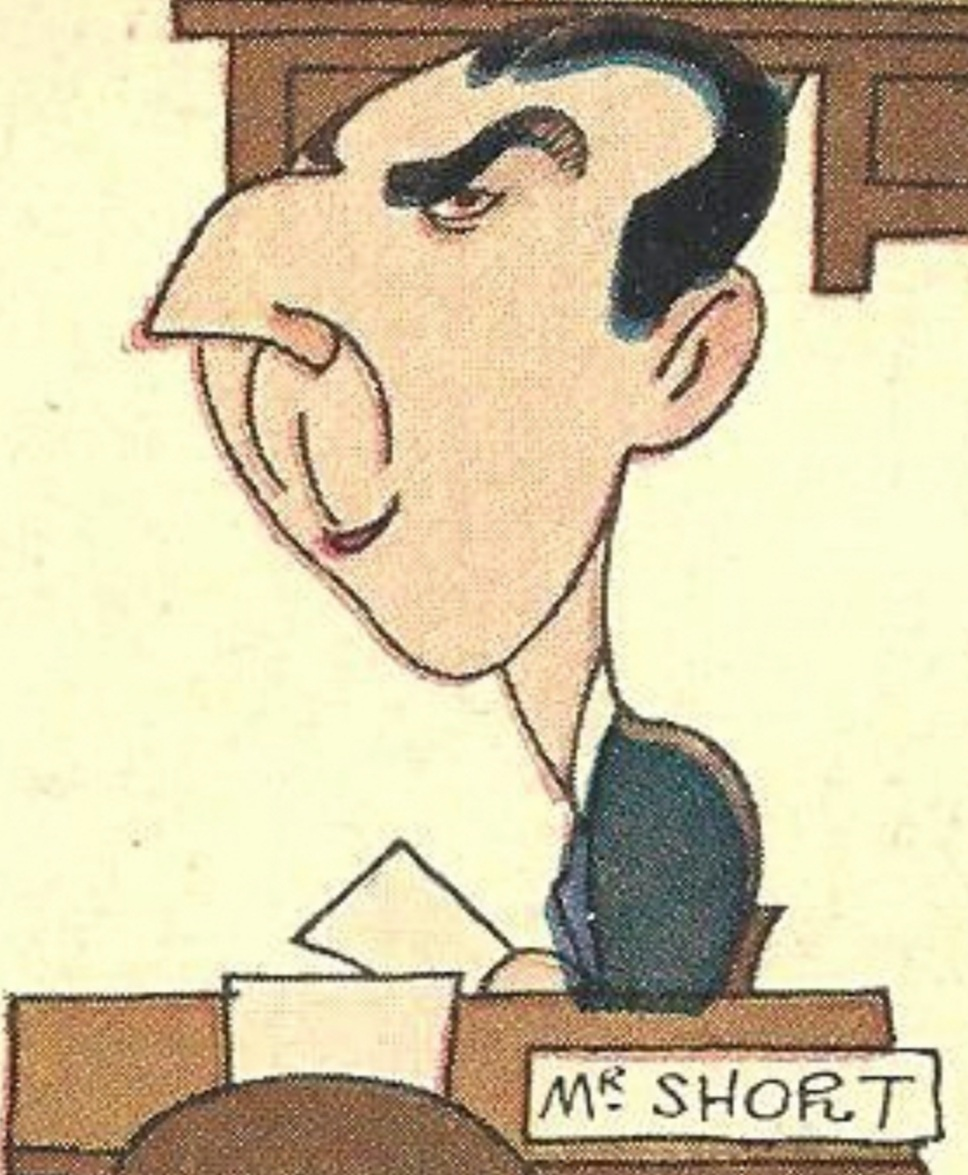
Caricature by Ralph Barton, 1925

A homosexual in a closeted era, Short enjoyed a long-lasting relationship with Billy Ladd, a former chorus dancer. Short retired to the south of France in 1952, and died there in 1956.

== Filmography ==
Year	Title	Role	Notes	References
1917	The Moth	A. Valentine Spencer	Incomplete film	
1918	The Turn of the Wheel	Wally Gage	Lost film	
1919	The Stronger Vow	Bibi Leroux	Lost film	
1919	The Way of a Woman	Johnnie Flinch		
1921	Woman's Place	Freddy Bleeker		

== Stage productions ==
Among the more notable productions that Short staged are the following (original productions unless stated otherwise):

Year opened	Title	Theater	References
1921	Music Box Revue	Music Box Theatre	
1925	Sunny	New Amsterdam Theatre	
1926	Oh, Please!	Fulton Theatre	
1930	Three's a Crowd	Selwyn Theatre	
1931	The Band Wagon	New Amsterdam Theatre	
1932	Face the Music	New Amsterdam Theatre	
1933	As Thousands Cheer	Music Box Theatre	
1933	Roberta	New Amsterdam Theatre	
1934	The Great Waltz	Center Theatre	
1935	Jubilee	Imperial Theatre	
1937	Ferderika	Imperial Theatre	
1937	Between the Devil	Imperial Theatre	
1937	Three Waltzes	Majestic Theatre	
1939	The Hot Mikado	Broadhurst Theatre	
1941	Lady in the Dark	Alvin Theatre	
1941	Banjo Eyes	Hollywood Theatre	
1943	Something for the Boys	Alvin Theatre	
1943	Carmen Jones	Broadway Theatre	
1944	Mexican Hayride	Winter Garden Theatre	
1945	Marinka	Winter Garden Theatre	
1946	Show Boat (revival)	Ziegfeld Theatre	
1948	Make Mine Manhattan	Broadhurst Theatre	
