= Pacie Ripple =

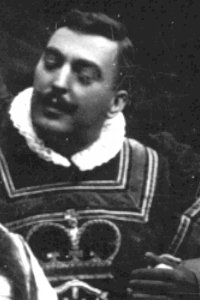
Pacie Ripple as Colonel Fairfax in The Yeomen of the Guard (1907)

Pacie Ripple (20 April 1864 – 16 April 1941) was an English operatic tenor known for playing in the operas of Gilbert and Sullivan from 1889 to 1890 and again from 1903 to 1907. He later had a career as a performer in the United States. There he created roles in such long-running hits as A Trip to Chinatown, The New Moon and Anything Goes. Later in life he told some colourful fibs about his birth, early training and career.

== Early life and career ==
Ripple was born as Arthur Boole in Ecclesfield, Yorkshire, in 1864, the son of Maria née England (1840–1885) and Robert Boole (born 1835), a labourer in an iron works and later a foreman gasfitter. By 1881 Arthur Boole was working as an engine pattern maker in his native town. Later in life he claimed to have trained at the Guildhall School of Music and to have worked for the director of the Leeds Festival before making his operatic début in Italy as the Duke in Rigoletto.

He was a member of the chorus and an understudy in a touring D'Oyly Carte Opera Company group when he made his first appearance in a named role in Wigan on 10 June 1889, as the leading tenor, Colonel Fairfax, in The Yeomen of the Guard by Gilbert and Sullivan. His next named role was in February 1890 as Francesco in another Savoy opera, The Gondoliers, when he was among a number of performers imported from Britain to bolster the failing D'Oyly Carte production at Palmer's Theatre in New York in February 1890. He remained in the United States when the production ended in April 1890 and, assuming the stage name Arthur Pacie, began to work for the American playwright and theatrical manager Charles H. Hoyt.

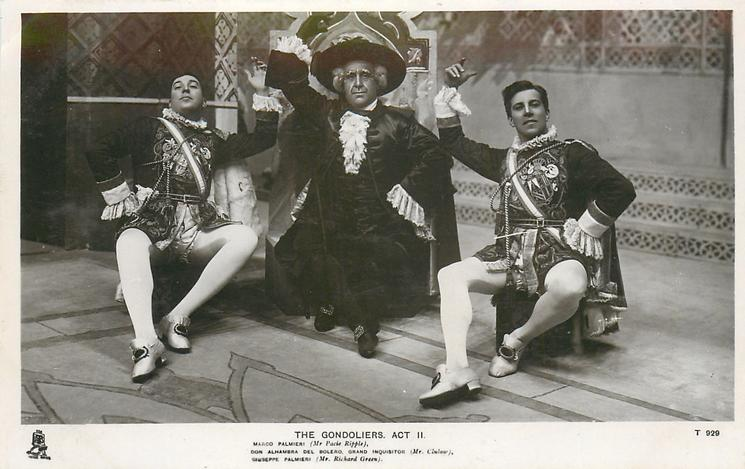
Ripple as Marco, John Clulow as Don Alhambra and Richard Green as Giuseppe in The Gondoliers (1907)

He made frequent appearances for Hoyt in New York between 1891 and 1897 as well as on tour, playing Norman Blood in A Trip to Chinatown, Howland Hooper in A Milk White Flag, and Carroll Sweet in A Stranger in New York. Following a tour of Australia and New Zealand he returned to England in 1900 using the stage name Pacie Ripple. On 20 November 1902 he appeared as Athos in a matineé performance of Original Musketeers at the Theatre Royal, Drury Lane and sang in oratorio and concerts. Ripple returned to the D'Oyly Carte Opera Company on tour as principal tenor between March 1903 and December 1906, appearing as Ralph Rackstraw in H.M.S. Pinafore, Frederic in The Pirates of Penzance, the Duke of Dunstable in Patience, Tolloller in Iolanthe, Cyril in Princess Ida, Nanki-Poo in The Mikado, Fairfax in The Yeomen of the Guard, and Marco in The Gondoliers. In 1906 he and his wife Ada Ripple toured South Africa with D'Oyly Carte. Ripple played Fairfax in the D'Oyly Carte's first London repertory season, in Yeomen at the Savoy Theatre in December 1906 followed by Marco in The Gondoliers in January 1907, following which he returned to touring in February 1907.

== Later years ==
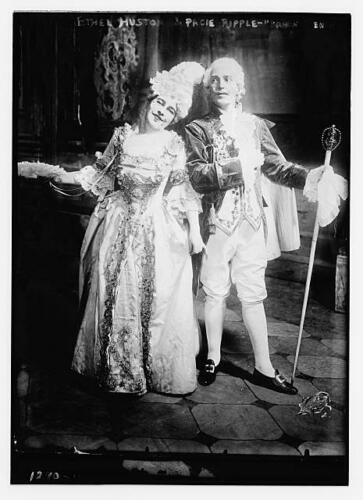
With Ethel Huston in Baron Trenck (1912)

Ripple finally left the D'Oyly Carte Opera Company in June 1907 and returned to the United States where he appeared in mostly musical comedies, in such works as Alvarez y Toledo in The Girls of Holland (1907); Herr von Trautenbach in Baron Trenck (1912); Valiant Dunnybrig in The Farmer's Wife (1924–1925); Mr. John Weston in The Complex (1925); Abe Pintree in Three Doors (1925); Robert Stanton in Mae West's scandalous play Sex (1926–1927); Bye Bye Bonnie (1927); Inspector Ratchett in The Wrecker (1928); Monsieur Beaunoir in The New Moon (1928–1929); Monsieur D'Ayen in The Little Father of the Wilderness (1930); Jung in Overture (1930–1931); Fauntley in The Good Companions at the Forrest Theatre (1931); Besson in The Barrister (1932) and Terry in Under Glass (1933), before creating the small role of Bishop Dodson in Anything Goes at the Alvin Theatre in 1934. From 1932 to his death in 1941 Ripple travelled annually from New York to Philadelphia to act as the stage director for the Savoy Company, America's oldest company performing the works of Gilbert and Sullivan.

On 20 April 1922 in St Louis in Missouri he married American-born actress Alice Estelle McComb Ripple (born 1890) who by marrying a British subject apparently lost her US nationality, as in 1931 she applied to become a naturalised American citizen. On her form she stated her husband had been born in Dublin, Ireland, in 1877, a fiction he included on various other official documents including census returns. In several interviews later in life Ripple made a number of false claims about his early career, including that he had been a principal tenor at the Savoy Theatre for 7 years and had acted as W. S. Gilbert's assistant stage manager.

Ripple died in New York City in April 1941 aged 76.
