= The Band Wagon (musical) =

- Sheet music cover (cropped)
- Music: Arthur Schwartz
- Lyrics: Howard Dietz
- Book: George S. Kaufman and Howard Dietz
- Productions: June 3, 1931 until January 16, 1932 Broadway

The Band Wagon is a musical revue with book by George S. Kaufman and Howard Dietz, lyrics also by Dietz and music by Arthur Schwartz. It first played on Broadway in 1931, running for 260 performances. It introduced the song "Dancing in the Dark" and inspired two films.

== Production ==
The revue opened on Broadway at the New Amsterdam Theatre on June 3, 1931, and concluded on January 16, 1932, running a total of 260 performances. Produced by Max Gordon, staging and lighting were by Hassard Short, choreography by Albertina Rasch, and scenic design by Albert R. Johnson. The cast included Fred Astaire, Adele Astaire, Helen Broderick, Tilly Losch, and Frank Morgan.

According to Steven Suskin, "very few people are around who saw The Band Wagon, but they all seem to insist that it was the finest Broadway revue ever." According to Furia and Lasser, The Band Wagon is "arguably the greatest of the 'little' revues of the 1930s". Ken Bloom states that The Band Wagon "is considered the greatest of all revues."

The show introduced one of the best Schwartz-Dietz songs, "Dancing in the Dark", which was also the title of one of the two motion pictures made from this show. (The other was The Band Wagon.) This was the first New York production to use the double revolving stage for the songs and sketches. Although it had incomparable dancing by Fred and Adele Astaire, it was the last time the brother and sister team appeared together.

In 2011, Lost Musicals, aka The Lost Musicals Charitable Trust, presented the UK premier of The Band Wagon. Ian Marshall Fisher, director, Jason Carr, music director.

== Songs and scenes ==
Act I

- Parody

Where Can He Be? – Helen Broderick
Nanette – Frank Morgan, Philip Loeb, Francis Pierlot

- Sweet Music – Fred Astaire, Adele Astaire
- High and Low – John Barker, Roberta Robinson
- Hoops – 2 French children dance and play – Fred Astaire, Adele Astaire
- (What's the Use of Being) Miserable with You? – Adele Astaire
- New Sun in the Sky – Fred Astaire
- I Love Louisa – in a Bavarian setting the company rides a merry-go-round – Fred Astaire, Adele Astaire

Act II

- White Heat – Adele Astaire
- The Beggar Waltz (dance) – Fred Astaire, Tillie Losch
- Dancing in the Dark – John Barker (singer), Tilly Losch (dancer) on a slanted, mirrored stage
- A Nice Place to Visit – Helen Broderick

== Sketches ==
A parody of the set pieces of the typical show, involved moonlight serenade, the waltz number, and the overworked blackout ("Where Can He Be?") and ("Nanette"). In the "Pour le Bain" sketch, Helen Broderick is a Westchester matron shopping for bathroom fixtures in an expensive store, including bathtubs and washbowls. Noting that there was no mention of the "other fixture," the salesman replies with a line of poetry from Keats -- "Heard melodies are sweet, but those unheard/ Are sweeter," followed by a blackout. Frank Morgan, a Southern colonel in "The Pride of the Claghornes," throws his daughter out because she never did anything wrong, thereby going against Southern tradition. Percy Hammond repeatedly noted about the attractive chorus girls "They look, as Miss Laurette Taylor used to say, as if they all had mothers." In "Good Old Nectar," instead of cheering the football star, the old graduates cheer the history champion (Adele Astaire, Fred Astaire, John Barker, Phillip Loeb, Frank Morgan, Francis Pierlot, Roberta Robinson, Jay Wilson).

== Recording ==
On October 5, 1931, RCA Victor pressed a two-sided record (program transcription) cut at 33 1/3 RPM of the Band Wagon score, featuring Fred and Adele Astaire, composers Dietz and Schwartz, and Leo Reisman's Orchestra (including jazz trumpeter Bubber Miley). This record (L-24003) was one of the first commercially recorded at that speed. (This was part of the new long playing "Program Transcription" series requiring a special 2-speed phonograph. Due to the Depression, they were never good sellers.) The program concluded with Fred and Leo Reisman's Orchestra performing a medley of "White Heat" and "Dancing In the Dark" (Astaire only sings on the former); the ending by the Orchestra is reminiscent of Paul Whiteman's 1927 "When Day Is Done".

In 1954, the composer/arranger John Serry Sr. recorded s swing jazz arrangement of the song I Love Louisa from the musical for the RCA Victor transcription series which was broadcast over the radio throughout the USA (See RCA Thesaurus).
