= The Moth (1917 film) =

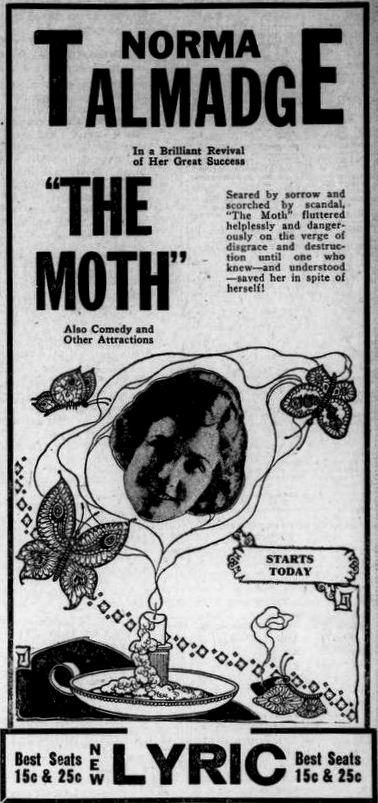
- Advertisement
- Directed by: Edward José
- Written by: John B. Clymer; Harry O. Hoyt
- Based on: The Moth by William Dana Orcutt
- Starring: Norma Talmadge; Eugene O'Brien; Hassard Short
- Cinematography: Benjamin Struckman; Edward Wynard
- Production company: Norma Talmadge Film Corporation
- Distributed by: Select Pictures
- Release date: October 1917
- Running time: 6 reels
- Country: United States
- Language: Silent (English intertitles)

The Moth is a 1917 American silent adventure drama film directed by Edward José and starring Norma Talmadge, Eugene O'Brien, and Hassard Short. The film is presumed lost, with either the first four of six reels or only portions of two reels held by the Library of Congress.

== Cast ==
- Norma Talmadge as Lucy Gillam
- Eugene O'Brien as Captain Bridgey
- Hassard Short as A. Valentine Spencer
- Virginia Dare as Nita Marbridge
- Adolphe Menjou as Teddy Marbridge / The Husband
- Donald Hall as Teddy Marbridge / The Husband
- Maude Allen as Mrs. Cunningham
- Frank Kingdon as Lawrence Gillam
- Robert Vivian as Tutor
- Kenneth Worms as Larry
- Aida Armand as Lucy's Little Girl
- Lorna Volare as Lucy's Little Boy
