= Lemuel Ayers =

American costume designer and producer

Lemuel Ayers (January 22, 1915 - August 14, 1955) was an American costume designer, scenic designer, lighting designer, and producer who had a prolific career on Broadway from 1939 until his death from cancer in 1955 at the age of 40. He designed sets for a total of 30 Broadway plays and musicals during his career, including both the original 1943 production and 1951 revival of Rodgers and Hammerstein's Pulitzer Prize winning musical Oklahoma!. Ayers also designed both costumes and sets for several productions, including St. Louis Woman (1946), My Darlin' Aida (1952), Kismet (1953), and The Pajama Game (1954). He served as lighting designer and scenic designer for one production, Harold Arlen's Bloomer Girl (1944), and he designed the entire productions of Song of Norway (1944) and Arthur Schwartz's Inside U.S.A. (1948). He won three Tony Awards in 1949, for the original production of Cole Porter's Kiss Me, Kate (1948), for which he designed both costumes and sets and worked as producer. He also directed portions of the 1945 musical film Ziegfeld Follies for MGM for which he also served as art director. He also worked as art director for the musical film Meet Me in St. Louis with Judy Garland and directed portions of the musical film Kiss Me Kate (1953).

== Biography ==
Born in New York City, Ayers earned a degree in drama from the University of Iowa and a degree in architecture from Princeton University. He made his Broadway debut as the scenic designer for producer and director Leonard Sillman's 1939 revival of R. C. Sherriff's Journey's End starring Colin Keith-Johnston as Stanhope. That same year he designed sets for a revival of Sidney Howard's They Knew What They Wanted with June Walker as Amy and Douglass Montgomery as Joe.

Ayers remained productively engaged on Broadway for the next sixteen years. He designed sets for the Broadway productions of Robert Wallsten and Mignon G. Eberhart's Eight O'Clock Tuesday (1941), Max Catto's They Walk Alone (1941), James Edward Grant's Plan M (1942), Norma Mitchell and John Harris's Autumn Hill (1942), S. N. Behrman's The Pirate (1942), Norman Armstrong's Lifeline (1942), John Patrick's The Willow and I (1942), Florence Ryerson's Harriet (1943), Rodgers and Hammerstein's landmark production of Oklahoma! (1943, and the 1951 revival), Ernest Pascal's Peepshow (1944), and Tennessee Williams's Camino Real (1953). He designed both sets and costumes for the Broadway productions of Shakespeare's As You Like It (1941), Shakespeare's Macbeth (1942), Patrick Hamilton's Angel Street (1943), Harold Arlen's St. Louis Woman (1946), Edmond Rostand's Cyrano de Bergerac (1946), Cole Porter's Out of This World (1950), My Darlin' Aida (1952), Kismet (1953), and The Pajama Game (1954).

Ayers was married to Shirley Osborn. They had two children together, Jonathan Ayers and Sarah Ayers. After his death from cancer on August 14, 1955, at New York Hospital, his widow and several friends set up the Lemuel Ayers Cancer Research Fund in lieu of a memorial. His widow said she hoped the fund, which was to be administered by the New York Hospital, would "help prevent other tragic wastes of life and talent by incurable types of cancer."
