= By the Beautiful Sea (musical) =

- Cover of Original Cast Recording (cropped)
- Music: Arthur Schwartz
- Lyrics: Dorothy Fields
- Book: Herbert Fields and Dorothy Fields
- Productions: 1954 Broadway

By the Beautiful Sea is a musical with a book by Herbert Fields and Dorothy Fields, lyrics by Dorothy Fields, and music by Arthur Schwartz. Like Schwartz's previous musical, A Tree Grows in Brooklyn, also starring Shirley Booth, the musical is set in Brooklyn just after the start of the 20th century (1907). By the Beautiful Sea played on Broadway in 1954.

== Productions ==
By the Beautiful Sea played in pre-Broadway tryouts in New Haven at the Shubert Theatre starting February 15, 1954; in Boston starting February 23; and Philadelphia starting March 16.

The musical opened on Broadway at the Majestic Theatre on April 8, 1954, transferred to the Imperial Theatre on October 2, 1954 and closed on November 27, 1954 after 270 performances. It was produced by Robert Fryer and Lawrence Carr, staged by Marshall Jamison and choreographed by Helen Tamiris. The cast featured Shirley Booth as Lottie Gibson, Wilbur Evans as Dennis Emery, Anne Francine as Flora Busch, Richard France as Mickey Powers, Carol Leigh as Baby Betsy Busch, Mae Barnes as Ruby Monk, and Cameron Prud'Homme as Carl Gibson. Cindy Robbins was featured as Molly Belmont. The orchestrations were by Robert Russell Bennett, sets and lighting by Jo Mielziner, and costumes by Irene Sharaff.

A staged concert was presented by "Musicals Tonight" in New York City in June–July 1999.

== Synopsis ==
In 1907, Lottie Gibson is a vaudeville performer, who also owns a theatrical boarding house in Coney Island; that is, "by the sea". Her clientele are show people. On one of her vaudeville tours she falls in love with a Shakespearean actor, Dennis Emery. When he is to appear in Brighton, Lottie gets him to stay at her boarding house, where his divorced wife—and stage mother—Flora Busch and daughter "Baby Betsy" (although Baby is 17) are also residents. Baby Betsy is infatuated with Mickey Powers, a singing waiter. Mickey thinks that Baby is really as young as her mother forces her to dress, and so, although he has feelings for her, thinks that she is too young.

To add to her troubles, Lottie discovers that her father, Carl Gibson, has taken her money to invest in a Midway attraction. Since she wants to lend the money to Dennis, Lottie decides to try to win the prize for making a parachute jump. Although she wins the prize, the money is not enough. But happily, another prize has been awarded to a man who had been shot out of a cannon, who is revealed as her father, and Lottie has all the money for Dennis. Lottie performs her specialty act, "Lottie Gibson Specialty" as an obnoxious child who refuses to share her parents with a baby brother. She ruefully complains about the awful assortment of men who had been in her life ("I’d Rather Wake Up by Myself").

Jealous Baby Betsy tries to break up the romance between her father and Lottie. Lottie declares that she will give up Dennis, not wanting to come between father and daughter. But, she gives Baby Betsy one of her dresses, and Baby turns into a more appropriate teen-ager. Lottie succeeds in winning over the affections of the young lady, and they go off to the midway where they find Mickey and Dennis, with a happy romantic ending.

== Songs ==
Act I

- Mona from Arizona - Quartet
- The Sea Song - Lottie, Boarders, Neighbors
- Old Enough to Love - Mickey Powers
- Coney Island Boat - Lottie, Half-Note, Visitors
- Alone Too Long - Dennis Emery
- Happy Habit - Ruby Monk
- Good Time Charlie - Mickey Powers, Lenny, Sidney, Cora Belmont, Molly Belmont and Lillian Belmont
- I'd Rather Wake Up by Myself - Lottie
- Hooray for George the Third - Diabolo, Visitors

Act II

- Hang Up - Ruby, Boarders, Neighbors
- More Love Than Your Love - Dennis Emery
- Lottie Gibson Specialty - Lottie
- Throw the Anchor Away - Burt Mayer, Dancer and Cora Belmont
- Finale - Company

== Critical response ==
The critics praised Booth's performance. "Everyone has long since lost his heart to Miss Booth," wrote Brooks Atkinson in The New York Times. Walter Kerr praised her "ease and self-assurance". "She is so radiantly confident that the marquee outside glows brighter for having her in the neighborhood."

In reviewing the 1999 concert, Martin Denton (NYTheatre.com) commented: "...although it finds none of its illustrious authors at his or her best, it is nevertheless a sturdy and pleasant entertainment."

== Recording ==
A cast recording of the original production was released by Capitol Records in 1954.
