= Paul Haakon =

Danish ballet and Broadway dancer

- Born: Paul Haakon Løngreen Nilson Panduoro; September 7, 1911; Fredericia, Denmark
- Died: August 16, 1992 (aged 80); New York City, U.S.
- Resting place: Pohick Church
- Occupation: Dancer
- Years active: 1933–1970
- Spouse: Violet Dunne Haakon (m. 1955)
- Children: 3

Paul Haakon (September 7, 1911 – August 16, 1992), born Paul Haakon Løngreen Nilson Panduoro, was a Danish Ballet and Broadway dancer.

== Life and career ==
=== Early life ===
Haakon was born on September 8, 1911, in Fredericia, Denmark. He studied ballet at the Royal Opera House in Copenhagen.

=== Career ===
Haakon made his Broadway debut in 1933 in Champagne, Sec and continued to dance in numerous Broadway productions. He also performed in vaudeville acts at Radio City Music Hall alongside lead ballerina Patricia Bowman. In 1935, he briefly joined the American Ballet. During this period, the St. Louis Globe-Democrat noted that he had danced with Pavlova and called him "another Nijinski."

During World War II, Haakon toured with the United Service Organizations. He returned to the stage in the mid-forties, choreographing and dancing for Mexican Hayride and choreographing Spook Scandals. Expanding into television and film, Haakon also appeared on The Milton Berle Show, danced for the 1956 movie Around the World in 80 Days, and was the assistant dance director for the film So This Is Love.

Haakon joined the Jose Greco Spanish Ballet as a performer, eventually also serving as ballet master and production manager. Haakon and Greco developed a close friendship, and Haakon remained with the group until his retirement.

In 1970, Haakon retired from dance. In his later years, he worked as a salesman and a mail handler.

=== Death ===
Haakon died of cancer in New York City on August 16, 1992. In an obituary in The Washington Post, Haakon was described as "among the great male ballet dancers of the 20th century".

== Filmography ==
=== Broadway ===
Year	Title	Role	Notes
1933	Champagne, Sec	Himself – Dancer	
1934	Music Hath Charms	Venetian Hooligan Himself – Dancer	
1935	Alma Mater		
1935	At Home Abroad	Himself – Dancer	
1936	The Show Is On	Casanova Himself – Dancer	
1937	Hooray For What!	Himself – Principal Dancer	
1944	Mexican Hayride	Paul	

=== Film ===
Year	Title	Role	Notes
1929	Wedding on the Volga	Tosha	
1956	Around the World in 80 Days	Flamenco dancer at Cave of the Seven Winds	
