= High Button Shoes =

Musical

- 1947 Original Broadway Production Poster
- Music: Jule Styne
- Lyrics: Sammy Cahn
- Book: Stephen Longstreet; George Abbott
- Basis: Novel by Stephen Longstreet; The Sisters Liked Them Handsome
- Productions: 1947 Broadway; 1948 West End; 1956 Television; 1982 Goodspeed Opera House; 2007 Goodspeed Opera House

High Button Shoes is a 1947 musical with music by Jule Styne, lyrics by Sammy Cahn and book by George Abbott and Stephen Longstreet. It was based on the semi-autobiographical 1946 novel The Sisters Liked Them Handsome by Stephen Longstreet. The story concerns the comic entanglements of the Longstreet family with two con men in Atlantic City.

The musical opened on Broadway in 1947 (running for 727 performances), and in London's West End in 1948, and has had several regional revivals as well as being televised in 1956.

== History ==
Many involved with High Button Shoes were Broadway first-timers or relatively unknown, except for the director, George Abbott. The creative team, composer Jule Styne, lyricist Sammy Cahn and writer Stephen Longstreet had worked in Hollywood, as had the producers Monte Proser and Joseph Kipness (who had also produced several short-lived Broadway shows) and actors Phil Silvers, who was known for his on-screen con-man persona, and Nanette Fabray. The designers Oliver Smith and Miles White and choreographer Jerome Robbins were all Broadway veterans. Rumors circulated that the book by Longstreet was "hopeless" and that Abbott and Silvers were "heavily rewriting" it. The Shuberts, involved because the show was to play in one of their theaters, approved an increase in Abbott's percentage to include author's royalties. Historian Ken Mandelbaum agrees that the show's book was originally by Longstreet but that it was extensively rewritten by Abbott.

== Synopsis ==
In New Brunswick, New Jersey in 1913, the Longstreet family, consisting of Mama, Papa, Mama's younger sister Fran, and her college boyfriend Oggle, is affected when a con man, Harrison Floy, and his shill, Mr. Pontdue, come to town. The duos' dubious intentions are made clear as Floy pitches "snake-oil" schemes ("He Tried to Make a Dollar") including selling fake watches and diamond mines, and the shill Mr. Pontdue asks for two. They are chased by the police, and the phony scheme is repeated. After they cheat the Longstreets in a phony land deal, Floy and Pontdue try to escape to Atlantic City, New Jersey with their ill-gotten profits and also take Fran (who has become romantically involved with Floy) with them.

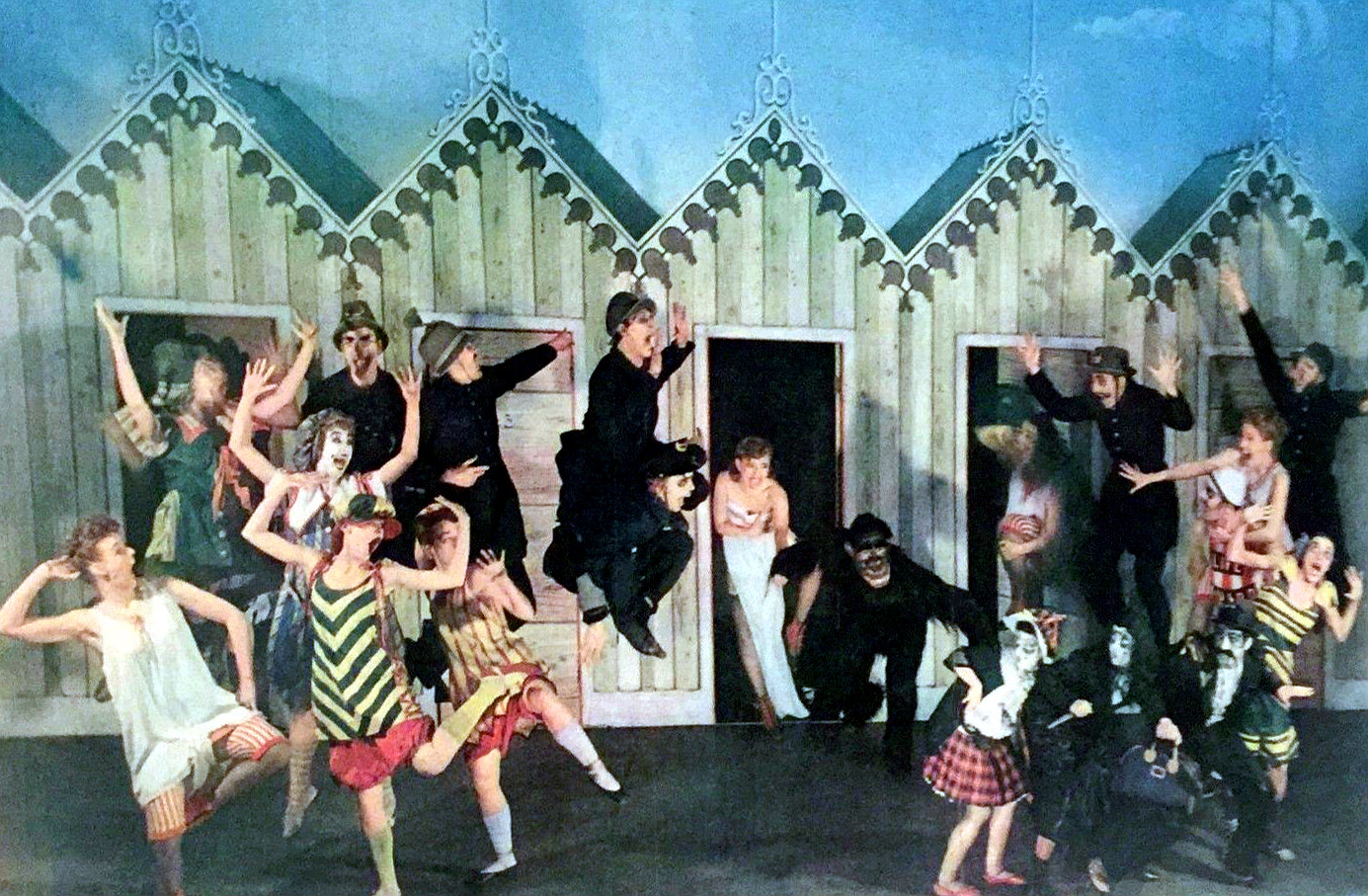
Scene from the Broadway play in 1948

As the con men Floy and Pontdue are pursued to the Atlantic City beach while carrying a satchel full of stolen money, the people on the beach dance around them ("The Bathing Beauty Ballet"). They tangle with a large number of people—including bathing beauties, lifeguards, other criminals, identical twins—and one gorilla. The climax occurs when the Keystone Cops arrive, and Floy loses everything when he bets on the wrong football team. But after his being captured we learn that Pontdue has bet on not a football team, but a filly named "Princeton." Floy gives the conned citizens their money back, but before he leaves tries to get the audience to buy one more item of "great worth..."

== Dance elements ==
The highlight of the original production was a long (7- to 10-minute) ensemble dance number ("The Bathing Beauty Ballet", to the song "On a Sunday by the Sea") at the beginning of the second act. Choreographer Robbins staged this number in the manner of a Mack Sennett silent slapstick film. It uses the music of "On A Sunday By the Sea", Liszt's Second Hungarian Rhapsody, and Offenbach's can-can from Orpheus in the Underworld. "This number was so basic to the show that deleting it would render the evening incoherent. It was a major evocation of a period, a tribute to silent-film comedy." Amanda Vaill, in her biography of Robbins, describes this dance number: "The actors careen across the stage, in and out of a row of boardwalk bathhouses, slamming doors, falling, rolling, leaping to their feet, colliding with one another, in a masterpiece of intricately plotted chaos that bears all the marks of the developing Robbins style: wit, character, drama, and precision."

== Songs ==
Act I

- He Tried to Make a Dollar – Singers
- Can't You Just See Yourself in Love with Me? – Hubert Ogglethorpe and Fran
- There's Nothing Like a Model T – Harrison Floy and Company
- Next to Texas, I Love You – Hubert Ogglethorpe and Fran
- Security – Sara Longstreet, Fran and Singing Girls
- Bird Watcher's Song – Sara Longstreet and Singing Girls
- Get Away for a Day in the Country – Henry Longstreet, Stevie Longstreet and Singers
- Papa, Wont You Dance with Me? – Sara Longstreet, Henry Longstreet, Girls and Boys

Act II

- On a Sunday by the Sea – Singers
- You're My Girl – Hubert Ogglethorpe and Fran
- I Still Get Jealous – Sara Longstreet and Henry Longstreet
- You're My Boy – Harrison Floy and Mr. Pontdue
- Nobody Ever Died for Dear Old Rutgers – Harrison Floy, Hubert Ogglethorpe and Singing Boys
- He Tried to Make a Dollar (Reprise) – Entire Company

== Productions ==
High Button Shoes opened on Broadway at the New Century Theatre October 9, 1947, it transferred to the Shubert Theatre December 22, 1947, then to The Broadway Theatre October 18, 1948, before closing July 2, 1949, after 727 performances. The cast starred Silvers as Harrison Floy and Fabray as Sara Longstreet (who was replaced by Joan Roberts in June 1948), and featured Joey Faye as Mr. Pontdue and Jack McCauley as Henry (Papa) Longstreet. The direction was by Abbott, choreography by Jerome Robbins, scenic design by Oliver Smith, costume design by Miles White, and lighting design by Peggy Clark. Robbins won the Tony Award for choreography.

The U.S. national tour ran in parallel with the Broadway shows, with Eddie Foy Jr. as Harrison Floy, Audrey Meadows as Sara "Mama" Longstreet and Jack Whiting as Henry "Papa" Longstreet. It opened at the Boston Opera House April 26, 1948, played at least 16 cities in the Midwest and Great Plains, including Chicago, Denver and Minneapolis, as well as Los Angeles on August 15, 1949, and closed December 31, 1949, in Kansas City.

A London production opened at the Hippodrome December 22, 1948, and ran for 291 performances. Two unknowns, Audrey Hepburn and Alma Cogan, were among the chorus girls.

A television adaptation was broadcast live November 24, 1956, on NBC with Nanette Fabray and Joey Faye repeating their original roles, Hal March as Harrison Floy and Don Ameche as Papa Longstreet.

The musical was revived at the Goodspeed Opera House, East Haddam, Connecticut July 1982 through September 11, 1982. Goodspeed Musicals revived the work again, July 13 through September 22, 2007.

More recently, the musical was revived again at the New York City Center on May 8–12, 2019.

== Principal casts ==
Character	Broadway (1947)	Tour (1948)	London (1948)	Television (1956)	Goodspeed Opera House (1982)	Goodspeed Opera House (2007)	Encores! (2019)
Harrison Floy	Phil Silvers	Eddie Foy Jr.	Lew Parker	Hal March	Ray DeMattis	Stephen Bienskie	Michael Urie
Mr. Pontdue	Joey Faye	Marty Barrett	Tommy Godfrey	Joey Faye	John Remme	Ken Jennings	Kevin Chamberlin
Mama Sara Longstreet	Nanette Fabray	Audrey Meadows	Kay Kimber	Nanette Fabray	Joy Franz	Jennifer Allen	Betsy Wolfe
Papa Henry Longstreet	Jack McCauley	Jack Whiting	Sid James	Don Ameche	Joe Warfield	William Parry	Chester Gregory
Fran	Lois Lee	Ellen Hanley	Hermene French	???	Lora Jeanne Martens	Russell Arden Koplin	Carla Duren
Hubert Ogglethorpe	Mark Dawson	Harry Fleer	Jack Cooper	???	J. Keith Ryan	Brian Hissong	Marc Koeck

== Response ==
Brooks Atkinson, theatre critic for The New York Times, wrote that it was a "very happy musical show in a very cheerful tradition." He particularly praised Phil Silvers' performance as "an uproarious comic. He has the speed, the drollery and the shell-game style of a honky-tonk buffoon." He commented that the story was a "sentimentally amusing fable" and that the songs were "simple in style and very pleasant to hear."
