= My Darlin' Aida =

My Darlin’ Aida
- Sheet music
- Music: Giuseppe Verdi
- Lyrics: Charles Friedman
- Book: Charles Friedman
- Basis: Verdi's opera Aida
- Productions: 1952 Broadway

My Darlin’ Aida is a 1952 Broadway musical play with music by Giuseppe Verdi, lyrics by Charles Friedman, based on Verdi's opera, Aida. It was produced by Robert L. Joseph.

== Production ==
My Darlin’ Aida premiered on Broadway at the Winter Garden Theatre on October 27, 1952, and closed on January 10, 1953, after 89 performances.

It was staged by Charles Friedman; supervised and lighted by Hassard Short (his last show); production designed and costumed by Lemuel Ayers; choreography by Hanya Holm; music director Franz Allers; and choral director Robert Shaw.

The company starred (evenings) Dorothy Sarnoff and Elaine Malbin and featured William Ovis, Howard Jarratt, William Wilderman, William Dillard, and many others.

As Brooks Atkinson of The New York Times stated, “Verdi’s music in “My Darlin’ Aida,” . . . is romantically Italian. Charles Friedman’s new libretto is American, with a strong dash of “Uncle Tom’s Cabin” seasoning. Despite the beauty of the singing by Dorothy Sarnoff and Elaine Milbin, there is no way of avoiding the fact that the music and the libretto have nothing in common, except, perhaps, a certain shoddiness of style.”

== Musical Numbers ==
Act I

- “My Darlin’ Aida”
- “Love Is Trouble”
- “Me and Lee”
- “March on for Tennessee”
- “Why Ain’t We Free?”
- “Knights of the White Cross”
- “Jamboree”
- “Dance”
- “Letter Duet”
- “Homecoming”
- “When You Grow Up”
- “Soldier’s March”
- “Ballet”
- “King Called Cotton”
- “Gotta Live Free”
- “Master and Slave”
- “Sing! South! Sing!”

Act II

- “Spiritual”
- “I Want to Pray”
- “Alone”
- “Three Stones to Stand On”
- “You’re False”
- “They’ll Have to Be Changes Made”
- “Away”
- “Land of Mine”
- “Ballet”
- “I Don’t Want You”
- “The Trial”
- “You are My Darlin’ Bride”
- “Oh, Sky, Goodbye”
