= Up in Central Park =

- Sheet Music Cover (cropped)
- Music: Sigmund Romberg
- Lyrics: Dorothy Fields
- Book: Herbert Fields and Dorothy Fields
- Productions: 1945 Broadway

Up in Central Park is a Broadway musical with a book by Herbert Fields and Dorothy Fields, lyrics by Dorothy Fields, and music by Sigmund Romberg. The musical, originally called "Central Park" before Broadway (see image of sheet music), was Romberg's last stage work produced during his lifetime.

Produced by Michael Todd, the Broadway production, staged by John Kennedy, and choreographed by Helen Tamiris, opened on January 27, 1945 at the New Century Theatre, where it ran for 504 performances. The cast included Noah Beery Sr., Wilbur Evans and Betty Bruce.

The musical is set in the Boss Tweed era of New York City in the 1870s. Wilbur Evans plays John Matthews, a New York Times reporter investigating the Tweed’s crooked political machine, especially the fraud connected with constructing Central Park. He falls in love with the daughter of one of the Boss’ ward heelers, who marries a politician, who is killed. She later rekindles her love for Matthews. The settings, costumes and dances evoked the lithographs of Currier and Ives.

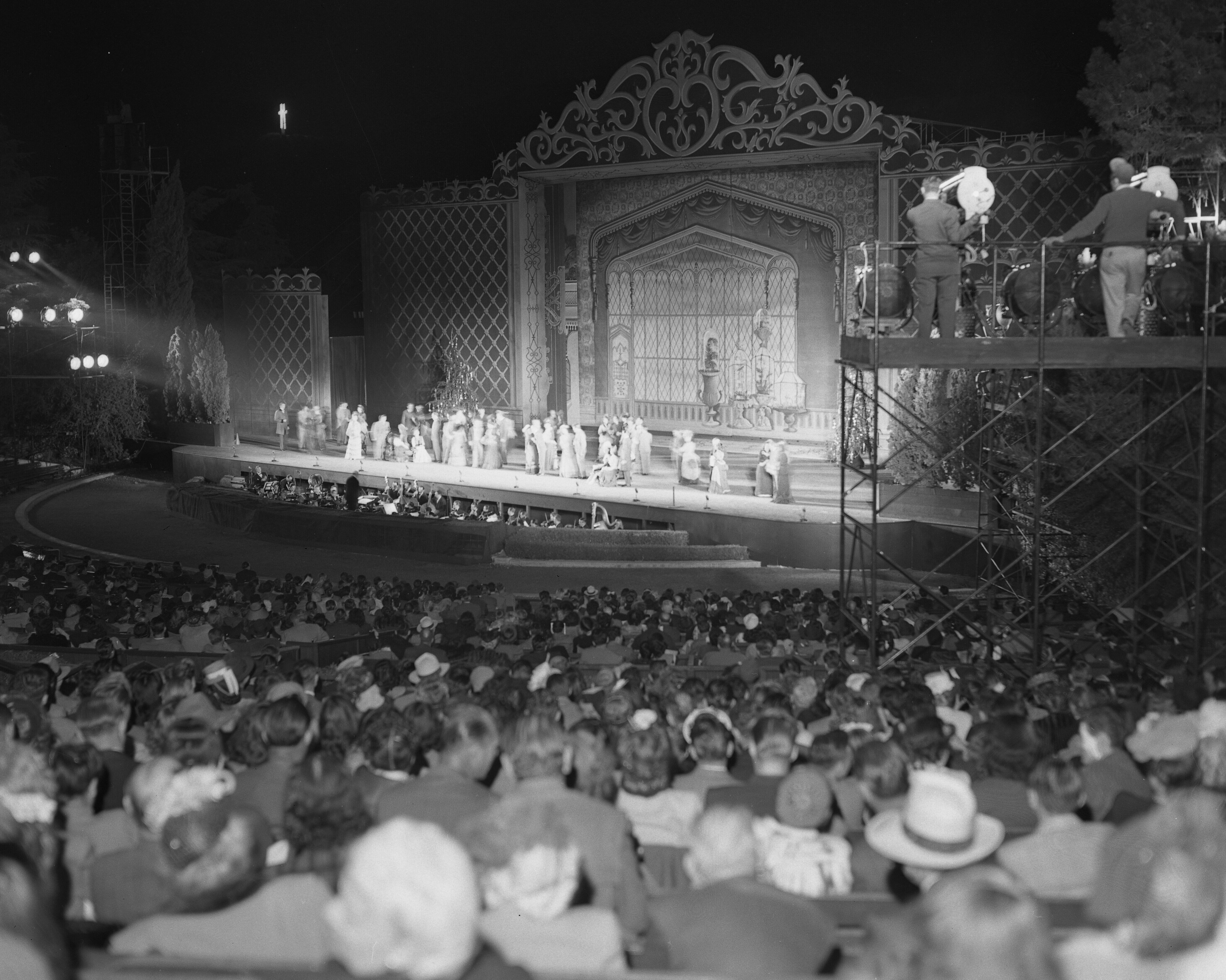
1946 production at the Hollywood Bowl.

== Songs ==
Act I

- Up from the Gutter
- Carousel in the Park
- It Doesn’t Cost You Anything to Dream
- Boss Tweed
- When She Walks in the Room
- Currier and Ives
- Close as Pages in a Book
- Rip Van Winkle
- The Fireman’s Bride

Act II

- When the Party Gives a Party
- Maypole Dance
- The Big Back Yard
- April Snow
- Finaletto
- The Birds and the Bees

== Production history ==
The musical premiered on Broadway in 1945. It was revived in 1982 by Equity Library Theatre.

== Film version ==
In 1948 the musical was made into a film directed by William A. Seiter and starring Deanna Durbin, Dick Haymes and Vincent Price. Mary Grant designed the film's costumes. The movie version omits much of the Broadway score and changes the story considerably. The film was not a success.

== Recordings ==
Decca released an album of eight songs from the show with original cast members Wilbur Evans and Betty Bruce, along with the show orchestra conducted by Max Meth. Also appearing on the album are Eileen Farrell and Celeste Holm, who were not in the show.

RCA Victor put out an album with Jeanette MacDonald and Robert Merrill singing six selections from the score, with Russell Bennett conducting. (78 rpm set M-991, discs 10-1153/4/5)
