= Mexican Hayride (musical) =

1944 musical

- Sheet music cover (cropped)
- Music: Cole Porter
- Lyrics: Cole Porter
- Book: Herbert Fields and Dorothy Fields
- Productions: 1944 Broadway - 481 performances

Mexican Hayride is a musical with a book by Herbert Fields and Dorothy Fields and music and lyrics by Cole Porter. The show opened on Broadway in 1944.

== Production ==
Produced by Michael Todd, out of town tryouts began at the Shubert Theatre, Boston on December 29, 1943. The production opened on Broadway on January 28, 1944 at the Winter Garden Theatre, moved to the Majestic Theatre on December 18, 1944 and closed on March 17 1945 after 481 performances.

The production was staged by Hassard Short, who also was the lighting designer, with choreography by Paul Haakon, set by George Jenkins and costumes by Mary Grant. Various segments were separately directed. Dan Eckley directed the opening dance; Lew Kesler directed the songs "Girls" and "Abracadabra"; and Virginia Johnson and Dan Eckley directed the dance "Good-Will Movement". The cast featured Bobby Clark (Joe Bascom), June Havoc (Montana), George Givot (Lombo Campos), Wilbur Evans (David Winthrop) and Paul Haakon (Paul).

In 2011, LOST MUSICALS™, a.k.a. The Lost Musicals Charitable Trust 1069268, presented 'Mexican Hayride' in London's Sadler's Wells Theatre. Ian Marshall Fisher directed, Michael Haslam Music Director, cast included Louise Gold, Graham Bickley, Michael Roberts.

== Plot overview ==
After successfully fighting a bull in Mexico, Montana, a lady bullfighter, is about to throw the ear to David, the American chargé d'affaires. When she spots the fugitive, Joe, she angrily throws the ear at him, as he is her brother-in-law. Since he has caught the ear, he becomes a hero and an honored guest. Joe joins with a speculator to form a national lottery. Mexican authorities go after them and they are forced to flee. They show up in various disguises, as mariachi players, as tortilla vendors, or as an Indian woman. They are finally snared and Joe has to return to the U.S. to face trial. Montana and David are reunited.

== Songs ==
Act I

- Entrance of Montana – Principals, Girls and Boys
- Dance – Girls and Boys
- Sing to Me, Guitar – Lolita, Ensemble and Musical Trio
- The Good-Will Movement – David and Ensemble
- I Love You – David
- There Must Be Someone for Me – Montana
- Carlotta – Lolita and Ensemble
- Girls – Boy and Girls

Act II

- What a Crazy Way to Spend Sunday – Girls and Boys
- Abracadabra – Montana and Boys
- Dance – Girls, Boys and the Mariachi Players
- Count Your Blessings – Montana and boys
- Toreador Ballet – Paul and Ensemble

== Reception ==
Life Magazine called the musical "Broadway's flashiest and most opulent show of the moment" but wrote that "despite its colossal aspects, it ends up as a showcase for the talents of two performers: loping, braying Bobby Clark and hoydenish, streamlined June Havoc. Clark clowns his way through the part of a U.S. confidence man...Miss Havoc, in the role of an American girl who becomes one of Mexico's most famous bullfighters, emerges as a personality more engaging than her better-known sister, Gypsy Rose Lee. Both she and Clark are wonderful enough to make audiences forgive 'Hayride' its sleazy book and a Cole Porter score that is a sad reminder that the composer of 'Night and Day' seems, at least temporarily, to have written himself dry."

"The production was lavish, with a large cast and a delectable chorus line. One critic felt that the production itself was the star." The Journal-American reviewer wrote:"Broadway in general, and the drama critics in particular, can continue their custom of writing the word 'fabulous' in front of the name of Mike Todd. For the truth is that last night the fabulous Todd produced a musical comedy so funny, so tuneful, so beautiful, that you could hardly believe your ears and eyes."

Ward Morehouse, writing in The New York Sun said, "'Mexican Hayride' joins the town's super hits; Mr. Todd has outdone himself." Louis Kronenberger, writing in New York Newspaper PM put it this way, "'Mexican Hayride' is the big straight musical show with the first-rate comic that Broadway, this season, has waited for and needed." John Chapman, writing in the New York Daily News summed it up this way, "'Mexican Hayride' is the first $5.50 musical in a dozen years, and I think it will pay off for Mr. Todd. Its one defect—a few moments of slowness in the first act—is soon forgotten, and the rest is pleasure. And the show is clean."

== Recording ==
A cast recording of the original production is available. It was originally issued in 1944 on Decca [Decca A-372].

== Film ==
The film version of Mexican Hayride (1948) became a vehicle for Abbott and Costello and used no Cole Porter songs from the musical.

== Sources ==
- New York Theatre Critics' Reviews, 1944, Vol. V, Number 24.
- Mantle, Burns, ed., The Best Plays of 1943-1944, Dodd, Mead and Company, New York, 1944, pp. 451-452
