= Make Mine Manhattan =

1948 Broadway revue

- Sheet music
- Music: Richard Lewine
- Lyrics: Arnold Horwitt
- Premiere: January 15, 1948: Broadhurst Theatre

Make Mine Manhattan is a 1948 Broadway revue with music by Richard Lewine, lyrics by Hassard Short, and sketches by Arnold Horwitt and produced by Joseph Hyman.

== Production ==
Make Mine Manhattan premiered on Broadway at the Broadhurst Theatre on January 15, 1948, and closed on January 8, 1949, after 429 performances. It has previously had a tryout in Philadelphia at the Forrest Theatre for two weeks starting December 23, 1947.

It was staged and lighted by Hassard Short, with sketches directed by Max Liebman; music directed by Charles Sanford; choreography by Lee Sherman, settings by Frederick Fox and costumes by Morton Haack.

The company included Sid Caesar, in his Broadway debut, David Burns, Sheila Bond, Jack Kilty, Wayne Lamb, Kyle MacDonnell, Joshua Shelley and others. Brooks Atkinson of The New York Times called it "a very pleasant musical revue."

David Ewin described the show as follows: "Perhaps its greatest significance lay in the fact that it introduced Sid Caesar as one of the supreme comics of our time."

== Songs ==
- "Phil the Fiddler"
- "Movie House in Manhattan"
- "Traftz"
- "The Good Old Days"
- "Saturday Night in Central Park"
- "Ringalevio"
- "Noises in the Street"
- "Subway Song"
- "A Night Out"
- "My Brudder and Me"
- "Gentleman Friend"
- "I Don't Know Her Name"
- "I Fell in Love with You"
