= The New Moon =

1927 operetta by Sigmund Romberg and Oscar Hammerstein II

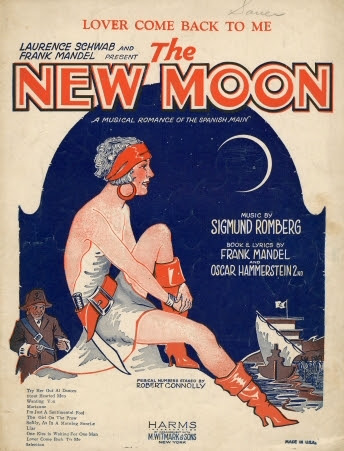
Sheet music cover for "Lover, Come Back to Me" from The New Moon (1928)

The New Moon is an operetta with music by Sigmund Romberg, lyrics by Oscar Hammerstein II and book by Oscar Hammerstein II, Frank Mandel, and Laurence Schwab. The show was the third in a string of Broadway hits for Romberg (after The Student Prince (1924) and The Desert Song (1926)) written in the style of Viennese operetta. Set around the time of the French Revolution, the story centers on a young French aristocrat in disguise, who has fled his country and falls in love with the daughter of a prominent New Orleans planter.

It premiered in Philadelphia in 1927 and played on Broadway in 1928. It spawned a number of revivals and two film adaptations, and it remains popular with light opera companies. The piece turned out to be "Broadway's last hit operetta", as World War II and the Golden Age of musicals approached, heralding a change in musical theatre genres.

== Performance history ==
The New Moon debuted in Philadelphia on December 22, 1927 at the Chestnut Street Opera House. The tryout was a failure, and the show was extensively revised before another tryout in Cleveland in August 1928 and then moving to New York City. Al Goodman conducted in both Philadelphia and New York.

The operetta opened on Broadway at the Imperial Theatre on September 19, 1928, ran for 519 performances, and closed at the Casino Theatre on December 14, 1929. The production used set designs by Donald Oenslager. The work was produced in London's West End at the Drury Lane Theatre in 1929. Although the piece received international productions and stock revivals lasting into the 1950s, it subsequently disappeared from the repertoire for a few decades. One commentator wrote, "What has kept The New Moon from being as familiar as Naughty Marietta or The Student Prince is perhaps its chronological place at the end of operetta's reign over the musical stage.

The operetta was restaged faithfully in 1986 by the New York City Opera and was telecast by PBS in 1989. The Light Opera of Manhattan staged the work several times in the 1980s.

City Center Encores! presented a semi-staged revival at New York City Center in March 2003. The Encores production was presented during the run-up to the Iraq War and part of the audience responded with loud applause and cheers to the line "One can be loyal to one's country and yet forswear its leader".

== Roles and original Broadway cast ==
- Marianne Beaunoir (soprano) — Evelyn Herbert
- Monsieur Beaunoir, her father — Pacie Ripple
- Julie, her maid (soprano) — Marie Callahan
- Captain Georges Duval — Edward Nell Jr.
- Robert Misson (tenor) — Robert Halliday
- Alexander (baritone) — Gus Shy
- Philippe L'Entendu (tenor) — William O'Neal
- Clotilde Lombaste (soprano) — Esther Howard
- Besac, boatswain of the 'New Moon' (baritone) — Lyle Evans
- Jacques, ship's carpenter — Earle Mitchell
- Vicomte Ribaud — Max Figman
- Flower Girl — Olga Albani
- Fouchette — Thomas Dale
- Emile, Brunet, Admiral de Jean, etc.

== Synopsis ==
Robert is a young French aristocrat whose revolutionist inclinations force him to flee his country. Under an assumed name, he sells himself as a bond-servant to planter and ship-owner Monsieur Beaunoir and his family in New Orleans in 1792. Because the Paris police are looking everywhere for him, Robert cannot tell Beaunoir or Beaunoir's beautiful daughter Marianne, with whom he has fallen in love, that he is of noble blood. Eventually he is tracked down by Vicomte Ribaud, the detective villain, and put aboard a ship, the New Moon, so that he can be returned to France. Robert thinks he has been betrayed by Marianne, who has gained her father's consent to travel on the same ship, pretending that she is in love with the ship's captain, Duval. A mutiny occurs, and Robert and the bond-servants come into power. Everyone goes ashore on the Isle of Pines, and a new republic is founded.

The republic flourishes under Robert's guidance, but Marianne, her pride hurt, at first refuses to marry Robert. French ships arrive, apparently to reclaim the island. Vicomte Ribaud expects them to conquer the island for the King of France. But the French Commander reveals that there has been a revolution in France, and that all aristocrats must die unless they renounce their titles. Ribaud, a Royalist, heads for execution, but republican Robert renounces his title. All ends happily for him and Marianne.

== Musical numbers ==
Act I

- Dainty Wisp of a Thistledown (Ensemble)
- Marianne (Robert)
- The Girl on The Prow (Marianne, Besac and Ensemble)
- Gorgeous Alexander (Julie, Alexander and Girls)
- An Interrupted Love Song (Captain Georges Duval, Marianne and Robert)
- Tavern Song (Flower Girl, a Dancer and Ensemble)
- Softly, as in a Morning Sunrise (Philippe and Ensemble)
- Stout-hearted Men (Robert, Philippe and Men)
- Fair Rosita (Girls and The Dancers)
- One Kiss (Marianne and Girls)
- Ladies of the Jury (Alexander, Julie, Clotilde Lombaste and Girls)
- Wanting You (Marianne and Robert)

Act II

- A Chanty (Besac and Men)
- Funny Little Sailor Man (Clotilde Lombaste, Besac and Ensemble)
- Lover, Come Back to Me (Marianne)
- Love Is Quite a Simple Thing (Robert, Besac, Alexander and Julie)
- Try Her Out at Dances (Alexander, Julie and Girls)
- Softly, as in a Morning Sunrise (reprise) (Phillippe and Men)
- Never (for You) (Marianne)
- Lover, Come Back to Me (reprise) (Robert and Men)

== Film versions ==
Two film versions were produced by MGM. The first, in 1930, starred Grace Moore and Lawrence Tibbett, with a setting in Russia. It added two new songs by Herbert Stothart and Clifford Grey. The second, in 1940, starred Jeanette MacDonald and Nelson Eddy.

A television version of a performance at New York City Opera aired on PBS's Great Performances in 1989 and was subsequently issued on VHS and DVD.

== Recordings ==
No original Broadway cast recording was made, but the 1928 London cast recorded some selections for Columbia. These 78 rpm records have been transferred to CD on the Pearl Label. The song "Stout-hearted Men" was recorded in 1930 by Perry Askam and in 1967 by Barbra Streisand, peaking at No. 2 on the Easy Listening chart.

Earl Wrightson and Frances Greer starred in Al Goodman's recording for RCA Victor (LK-1011). Decca made an album in 1953 with Lee Sweetland and Jane Wilson covering six selections from the score, which has been reissued on CD paired with The Desert Song. Gordon MacRae recorded a 10-inch LP for Capitol Records (Capitol H-219) in 1950 with Lucille Norman. It was repackaged as a split release in 1956 on one side of a 12-inch album with Rudolf Friml's The Vagabond King on the reverse, also with Lucille Norman (Capitol T-219). That release was reissued on CD in 2011 by Vintage Music.

Reader's Digest included the operetta in the 1963 collection, A Treasury of Great Operettas, starring Jeanette Scovotti and Peter Palmer and conducted by Lehman Engel. As part of a new series of stereo recordings of classic operettas, Capitol had MacRae and Dorothy Kirsten record three studio cast albums in 1962 and 1963. Their selections from The New Moon (Capitol SW-1966) are available on the EMI CD Music of Sigmund Romberg, along with selections from The Student Prince (Capitol SW-1841), and The Desert Song (Capitol SW-1842).

The Encores! cast recorded the score in 2004, using the original orchestrations, for Ghostlight Records. A reviewer wrote in Playbill that the recording "is eminently enjoyable. ... The New Moon is vibrant, full-bodied and – yes – stouthearted." John Kenrick praised Rodney Gilfry, Christiane Noll, Brandon Jovanovich, the supporting cast and the conducting, writing: "What a spectacular delight! ... [the] songs soar, exploding with romance and swashbuckling bravado."
