= Savoy Company =

American comic opera company

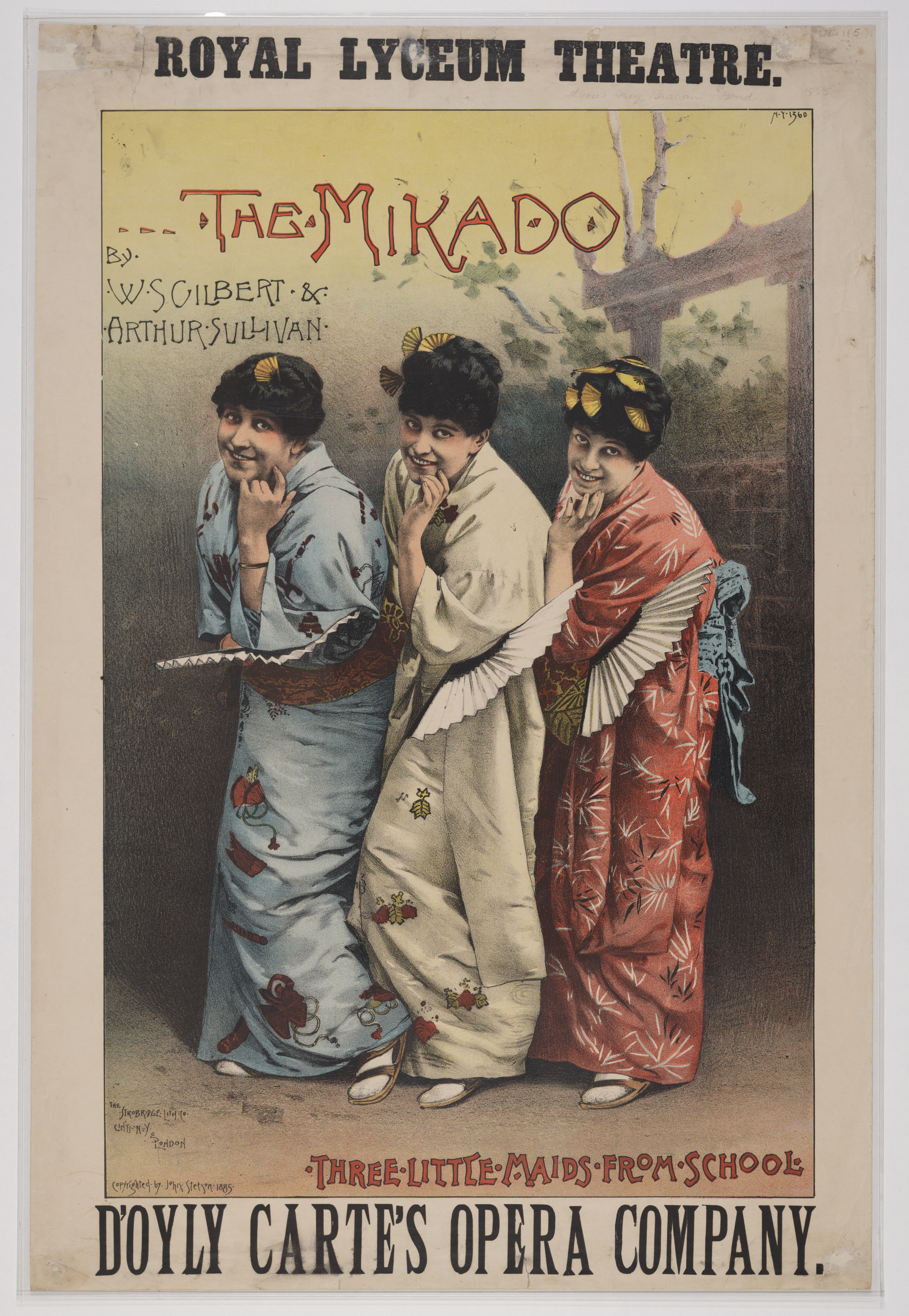
Lithograph from the Mikado

Founded in 1901, The Savoy Company is the oldest amateur theater company in the world dedicated solely to the production of the 13 surviving comic operas of Gilbert and Sullivan. Based in Philadelphia, Pennsylvania, the Savoy Company has performed at the spacious Academy of Music (since 1926, where it is the oldest tenant) and Longwood Gardens, where it was invited by founder Pierre S. du Pont.

The company gives Philadelphia audiences an opportunity to see the Gilbert and Sullivan works with full orchestra and comparatively opulent production values, compared with most amateur theatre groups. The company's productions typically reach an annual audience of approximately 8,000 people through two performances at the Academy of Music, one of the oldest grand opera houses in the country, and two performances at the outdoor theater within Longwood Gardens, located in Kennett Square, Pennsylvania.

== Charity through productions ==
Since 1901, The Savoy Company has been an important part of Philadelphia's cultural, philanthropic, and social arenas. The Company donates the net proceeds from its performances to local charitable organizations. In the past fifteen years, The Savoy Company has donated over $150,000 to local charitable organizations. Founded by Gilbert and Sullivan enthusiast and physician Alfred Reginald Allen (1876–1918) and a few of his friends, The Savoy Company has always performed the works of Gilbert and Sullivan (sharing the artistic, musical, and cultural influences of these works) and supported other local, charitable organizations. In 1918, members of the company established the Alfred Reginald Allen Scholarship Fund for the benefit of the Music Department of the University of Pennsylvania. The Company continues to support this fund with annual contributions. The Company also makes annual donations to local, charitable organizations, including the Red Cross, the American Cancer Society, the Children's Hospital of Philadelphia, Magee Rehabilitation Hospital, Big Brothers/Big Sisters, Daemion House, the Brandywine Conservancy, and the Delaware S.P.C.A., among many others.

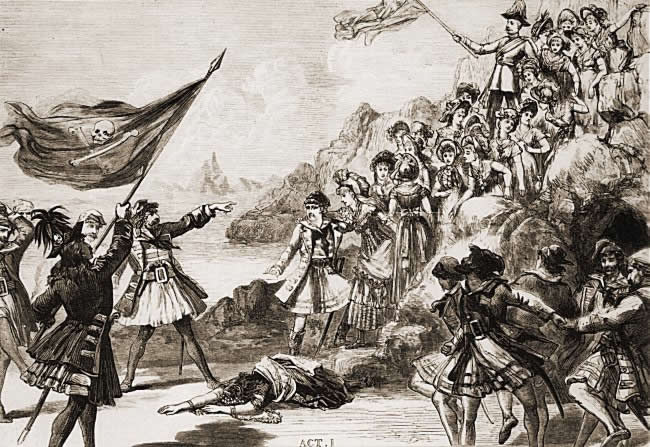
The Pirates of Penzance

The Savoy Company is financially self-supporting and covers the costs of its productions through ticket sales, donations, volunteer work and advertising in an extensive, printed program book.. All of the principal actors, chorus members, and backstage crew members are dues-paying members of the company. Officers, board members and committee chairs are all company members. Savoy provides its own choreographers and dancers. It also designs and builds its own sets, as well as costumes, props, and lighting. Each active member of the company typically donates hundreds of hours of volunteer time to the company every season. The Savoy season begins in early February, although production and administrative planning continue year-round. Staging rehearsals are held on Tuesday and Thursday evenings at various social club venues throughout the Philadelphia area. The backstage crew meets on Wednesday evenings and Saturdays. The Savoy Company's performances generally take place in late May and early June.

A smaller ensemble of The Savoy Company, The Savoy Travelling Troupe, presents concert-versions of its performances for area community events, schools, nursing, and retirement homes. The Travelling Troupe has also performed for special celebrations, such as Victorian Day in Cape May, New Jersey and the Radnor Hunt Three-Day event. It has sung the National Anthem before Philadelphia Eagles football games and Philadelphia Phillies baseball games. The Travelling Troupe has performed several times at the International Gilbert and Sullivan Festival held annually in Buxton, England, including at the Festival's Philadelphia legs in 1996 and 1997. In 1997, members of The Savoy Company were asked to work with former D'Oyly Carte Opera Company actors in their performance of "H.M.S. Pinafore" at the Festival. In 1999, Savoy also helped the Blue Hill Troupe in New York City to celebrate its 75th anniversary with a performance at the Metropolitan Museum of Art.

== Social function ==
Savoy's membership consists of volunteers drawn from the Greater Philadelphia area. Nelson Eddy was one of the members who later became a professional performer (for the company, Eddy played Strephon in 1922 and 1927 and the Major-General in 1923). All potential members (on-stage and backstage) are required to audition and take part in a short interview. The company provides a creative and social outlet for its several hundred active members. Over 50 couples have met their spouses through the company, and many of the members are second and third-generation members. Each season, Savoy sponsors a series of social events open to members and their friends. The Savoy season culminates with the traditional June Fatal, a formal black-tie dinner held in mid-June.
