= If This Isn't Love =

"If This Isn't Love" is a popular song composed by Burton Lane with lyrics written by E. Y. Harburg. It was published in 1946 and introduced by Ella Logan and Donald Richards the following year in the Broadway musical Finian's Rainbow.

== Recorded versions ==
- Buddy Clark (recorded on November 12, 1946, released on Columbia 37223)
- Ella Logan, Donald Richards and the Lynn Murray Singers (recorded on April 7, 1947)
- Alma Cogan - a single released in 1958
- Sarah Vaughan - for her album Sarah Vaughan Sings Broadway: Great Songs from Hit Shows (1958)
- Cannonball Adderley - included on his album Cannonball Takes Charge (1959)
- Biff McGuire, Jeannie Carson, Bobby Howes (1960 Broadway Revival)
- Dean Martin - for the album Finian's Rainbow (1963)
- Don Francks, Petula Clark, Fred Astaire (1968 Film Soundtrack)
- Stan Kenton - for his album Finian's Rainbow (1968)
- Karen Mason - for her album Not So Simply Broadway (1995)
- The Clayton Brothers - included in their album Siblingity (2000)
