= Finian's Rainbow (1968 film) =

1968 musical film directed by Francis Ford Coppola

- Theatrical release poster, artwork by Ted CoConis
- Directed by: Francis Ford Coppola
- Screenplay by: E. Y. Harburg; Fred Saidy
- Based on: Finian's Rainbow; 1947 musical by E. Y. Harburg; Fred Saidy
- Produced by: Joseph Landon
- Starring: Fred Astaire; Petula Clark; Don Francks; Keenan Wynn; Al Freeman Jr. Barbara Hancock; Tommy Steele
- Cinematography: Philip H. Lathrop
- Edited by: Melvin Shapiro
- Music by: Songs; Burton Lane; E. Y. Harburg; Score; Ray Heindorf
- Production company: Warner Bros.-Seven Arts
- Distributed by: Warner Bros.-Seven Arts
- Release date: October 9, 1968
- Running time: 145 minutes
- Country: United States
- Language: English
- Budget: $3.5 million
- Box office: $11.6 million

Finian's Rainbow is a 1968 American musical fantasy film directed by Francis Ford Coppola and adapted by E. Y. Harburg and Fred Saidy from the 1947 stage musical of the same name. It stars Fred Astaire, Petula Clark, and Tommy Steele. The plot follows an Irishman and his daughter, who steal a leprechaun's magic pot of gold and emigrate to the American South, where they become involved in a dispute between rural landowners and a greedy, racist U.S. senator.

Finian's Rainbow was Coppola's second film for a major studio, and third overall directorial work. It was released by Warner Bros.-Seven Arts as a roadshow presentation on October 9, 1968. It received mixed reviews, but was a commercial success. It received Oscar nominations for Best Score (Ray Heindorf) and Best Sound, along with five Golden Globe nominations, including for Best Motion Picture – Musical or Comedy.

== Plot ==
A scheming immigrant named Finian McLonergan arrives in America from his native Ireland, having absconded with a crock full of gold secreted in a carpetbag, plus his daughter Sharon in tow. His destination is Rainbow Valley in the fictional state of Missitucky, where he plans to bury his treasure in the mistaken belief that, given its proximity to Fort Knox, it will multiply.

Hot on Finian's heels is the leprechaun, Og, desperate to recover his stolen crock before he turns human. Among those who end up involved in the conflict are Woody Mahoney, a ne'er-do-well dreamer who woos Sharon; Woody's mute sister, Susan, who expresses herself in dance; Woody's good friend and business partner, Howard, an African-American botanist determined to develop a tobacco and mint hybrid; and Senator Billboard Rawkins, who is bigoted against African-Americans.

Complications arise when Rawkins, believing that there is gold in Rainbow Valley, attempts to seize the land from the people who live there, and makes some racial slurs while doing so. Sharon furiously wishes that he would turn black. Because she happens to be unknowingly standing on the spot where the magical crock of gold, which is capable of granting three wishes, is buried, Rawkins becomes a black man. Rawkins's dog, which has been trained to attack black people, chases him into the woods. The sheriff returns with the district attorney, who threatens to charge Sharon with witchcraft unless Rawkins is produced. Rawkins runs into Og in the woods, and tells him that a witch changed him from a white man to black. Seeing that the change of skin tone did nothing to alter his bigotry, Og casts a spell to make Rawkins more open-minded.

The townspeople gather in the barn for the wedding of Sharon and Woody, but the sheriff, his deputies, and the district attorney interrupt the ceremony and arrest Sharon for witchcraft. Finian convinces them that Sharon can change Rawkins back to white overnight, and they lock Sharon and Woody in the barn until daybreak. To save his daughter, Finian tries to find the crock of gold that he buried, unaware that Susan has discovered it and moved it. Og meets with Susan on the bridge under which she has hidden the gold and, as he develops romantic feelings for her in absence of Sharon, wishes that she could talk. When she begins to speak, Og realizes that he must be standing above the crock.

As the district attorney sets the barn on fire with Sharon and Woody locked inside, Og debates whether or not to use the gold's final wish to save them by turning the senator white again, knowing that the crock would lose its magic, the gold would disappear, and he would become fully mortal. After a passionate kiss from Susan, he happily accepts his fate to become human and wishes Rawkins white again. Sharon and Woody are released from the burning barn, and it is discovered that Howard's mentholated tobacco experiments have at last been successful, ensuring financial success for all the poor people of Rainbow Valley regardless of skin color. Sharon and Woody are wed, and everyone bids a fond farewell to Finian, who leaves Rainbow Valley in search of his own rainbow.

== Cast ==
- Fred Astaire as Finian McLonergan
- Petula Clark as Sharon McLonergan
- Tommy Steele as Og
- Don Francks as Woody Mahoney
- Keenan Wynn as Senator Billboard Rawkins
- Barbara Hancock as Susan the Silent
- Al Freeman Jr. as Howard
- Ronald Colby as Buzz Collins
- Dolph Sweet as Sheriff
- Wright King as District Attorney
- Louil Silas as Henry

== Production ==
=== Development ===
Because the musical was a success on stage, an interest in a film version existed early. In 1948, Metro-Goldwyn-Mayer wanted to acquire it as a vehicle for Mickey Rooney; however, MGM balked at Harburg's price of $1 million for the rights and complete creative control. For a time, a German company wanted to make the film version. In 1954, the Distributors Corporation of America began producing an animated film adaptation. A soundtrack of the score was recorded by Frank Sinatra, Louis Armstrong and Ella Fitzgerald, but the film was abandoned. In 1958, the authors of the musical teamed with Sidney Buchman to produce a film independently, but the project did not proceed.

In 1960, the film rights were held by Marvin Rothenberg, who wanted Michael Gordon to direct and Debbie Reynolds to star. It was announced that the film would be budgeted at $2 million, and released by United Artists, but once again, the film was never made. At that time, Harburg stated that he was told that part of the reason it was so difficult to get a film version made of Finian's Rainbow was because Hollywood was wary of making fantasy musicals. Another reason was the McCarthyism of the period. In 1965, Harold Hecht bought the film rights, and hired Harburg and Saidy to write a script and some new songs. Hecht said that he intended to film in nine months. "This time we really mean business", said Harburg. "We've gotten a substantial deal and participation in money and production. Up until now, Finian has been making so much money on the road that we didn't want to kill the goose laying all those golden eggs. But you become more idealistic as you grow older and you tend to stop thinking about yourself." Dick Van Dyke was considered to play the role of Finian, but financial problems caused the filming to be postponed, and Van Dyke dropped out to work on other projects.

=== Warner Bros. ===
In September 1966, Warner Bros. announced that it had the rights, and would make a film produced by Joseph Landon and starring Fred Astaire, with the aim to get Tommy Steele as the leprechaun. The budget was expected to be $4 million. Francis Ford Coppola was signed as director in February 1967. Steele was confirmed as the Irish leprechaun, although Robert Morse had expressed interest.

With the then-unreleased Camelot having proven to be more costly than anticipated, and its commercial prospects still unknown, Jack L. Warner was having second thoughts about undertaking another musical film, but when he saw Petula Clark perform on her opening night at the Cocoanut Grove in the Ambassador Hotel in Los Angeles, he knew that he had found the ideal Sharon. Warner decided to forge ahead and hope for the best, despite his misgivings of having nearly-novice "hippie" director, Francis Ford Coppola, at the helm. Coppola called the film "a very low-budget film that had the appearance of being very high-budget", and recalled that several of Finian's sets were, in fact, recycled and refurbished from Camelot.

Although Petula Clark had made many films in the 1940s and 1950s in her native England as a child star, this was her first starring role in 10 years, and her first film appearance since becoming an international pop star in the mid-1960s.

Fred Astaire's last appearance in a movie musical had been Silk Stockings, eleven years earlier. He had concentrated on his TV specials in the interim, but was persuaded at the age of 69 to return to the big screen. Given his status as a screen legend, and to accommodate his talents, the role of Finian was expanded for the film version and Astaire received top billing, rather than the part's original third billing.

While a construction crew transformed more than nine acres of the Warner Bros. back-lot into Rainbow Valley, complete with a narrow gauge railway, schoolhouse, general store, post office, residential houses and barns, Coppola spent five weeks rehearsing the cast. Before principal photography began, a complete performance of the film was presented to an audience on a studio sound stage. In the liner notes that she wrote for the 2004 Rhino Records limited, numbered-edition CD reissue of the soundtrack album, Clark recalls that Golden Age-Hollywood Astaire was puzzled by Coppola's contemporary methods of filmmaking, and balked at dancing in "a real field with cow dung and rabbit holes". Although he acquiesced to filming a sequence on location in Napa Valley near Coppola's home, the bulk of the movie was shot on Warner Bros. sound-stages and the back lot, leaving the finished film with jarring contrasts between reality and make-believe.

Clark was nervous about her first Hollywood movie, and particularly concerned about dancing with the legendary Astaire. Astaire later confessed that he was just as worried about singing with her. The film was partially choreographed by Astaire's long-time friend and collaborator Hermes Pan, though he was fired by Coppola during filming. Finian's Rainbow proved to be Astaire's last major movie musical, although he danced with Gene Kelly during the linking sections of MGM's That's Entertainment, Part 2 (1976).

Clark recalls that Coppola's approach was at odds with the subject matter. "Francis... wanted to make it more real. The problem with Finian's Rainbow is that it's sort of like a fairy tale... so trying to make sense of it was a very delicate thing." Coppola opted to fall somewhere in the middle, with mixed results. Updating the story line was limited to changing Woody from a labor organizer to the manager of a sharecroppers' cooperative, making college-student Howard a research botanist, and a few minor changes to the lyrics of the Burton Lane and E. Y. Harburg score, such as changing a reference to Carmen Miranda to Zsa Zsa Gabor. Other than that, the plot remains entrenched in an era that predates the Civil Rights Movement.

The railroad scenes were filmed on the Sierra Railroad in Tuolumne County, California.

Because preview audiences found the film overly long, the musical number, "Necessity", was cut before its release, although the song remains on the soundtrack album. It can be heard as background music when Senator Rawkins shows up in Rainbow Valley attempting to buy out Finian.

In August 2012, Petula Clark told the BBC Radio 4 show, The Reunion, that she and her fellow cast members smoked marijuana during the filming of the movie. "There was a lot of Flower Power going on," she said.

== Soundtrack CD ==
CD cover

- Overture
- Look to the Rainbow
- This Time of the Year
- How Are Things in Glocca Morra?
- Look to the Rainbow (Reprise)
- Old Devil Moon
- Something Sort of Grandish
- If This Isn't Love
- (That) Great Come-and-Get-It-Day
- Entr'acte
- When the Idle Poor Become the Idle Rich
- Rain Dance Ballet
- The Begat
- When I'm Not Near the Girl I Love
- How Are Things in Glocca Morra? (Reprise)
- Exit Music

== Release ==
The film premiered October 9, 1968, at the newly opened Warner Penthouse Theatre, a portion of the subdivided former Strand Theatre in New York City.

== Box office ==
In its first two months of release, the film earned $5.1 million in rentals in North America, ending its worldwide run with $11.6 million.

== Critical reception ==
Finian's Rainbow was released in major cities as a roadshow presentation, complete with intermission, at a time when the popularity of movie musicals was on the wane. The film was dismissed as inconsequential by many critics who were startled by Astaire's aged appearance and found Steele's manic performance as Og, the Leprechaun, annoying. In The New York Times, Renata Adler described it as a "cheesy, joyless thing", and added, "There is something awfully depressing about seeing Finian's Rainbow... with Fred Astaire looking ancient, far beyond his years, collapsed and red-eyed... it is not just that the musical is dated... it is that it has been done listlessly and even tastelessly."

Roger Ebert of the Chicago Sun-Times, on the other hand, thought that it was "the best of the recent roadshow musicals.... Since The Sound of Music, musicals have been... long, expensive, weighed down with unnecessary production values and filled with pretension.... Finian's Rainbow is an exception.... it knows exactly where it's going, and is getting there as quickly and with as much fun as possible... It is the best-directed musical since West Side Story. It is also enchanting, and that's a word I don't get to use much... it is so good, I suspect, because Astaire was willing to play it as the screenplay demands... he... created this warm old man... and played him wrinkles and all. Astaire is pushing 70, after all, and no effort was made to make him look younger with common tricks of lighting, makeup and photography. That would have been unnecessary: He has a natural youthfulness. I particularly want to make this point because of the cruel remarks on Astaire's appearance in The New York Times review by Renata Adler. She is mistaken."

Time Out London called it an "underrated musical... the best of the latter-day musicals in the tradition of Minnelli and MGM".

Highly praised by all was Petula Clark, who Ebert described as "a surprise. I knew she could sing, but I didn't expect much more. She is a fresh addition to the movies: a handsome profile, a bright personality, and a singing voice as unique in its own way as Streisand's."

John Mahoney of The Hollywood Reporter wrote that Clark "invites no comparisons, bringing to her interpretation of Sharon her own distinctive freshness and form of delivery".

In the New York Daily News, Wanda Hale cited Clark's "winsome charm which comes through despite a somewhat reactive role".

Joseph Morgenstern of Newsweek wrote that Clark "looks lovely" and "sings beautifully, with an occasional startling reference to the phrasing and timbre of Ella Logan's original performance".

Variety observed, "Miss Clark gives a good performance and she sings the beautiful songs like a nightingale."

On the review aggregator website Rotten Tomatoes, 47% of 19 critics' reviews are positive.

== Legacy ==
The Coen brothers have said that the film is among their favorites: "I remember when we worked with Nicolas Cage on Raising Arizona, we talked about his uncle, Francis Ford Coppola, and told him that Finian's Rainbow, which hardly anyone has ever seen, was one of our favorite films. He told his uncle, who I think has considered us deranged ever since."

Filmink magazine argued the film's critical reputation has unfairly suffered due to being grouped in with flop musicals from the late sixties and 1970s, and its "uneasy place within Francis Ford Coppola’s oeuvre", but has praised its music and cast in particular.

=== Awards and nominations ===
| Award | Category | Nominee(s) | Result | Ref. |
|---|---|---|---|---|
| Academy Awards | Best Score of a Musical Picture – Original or Adaptation | Ray Heindorf | Nominated | |
| Academy Awards | Best Sound | Warner Bros.-Seven Arts Studio Sound Dept. | Nominated | |
| Golden Globe Awards | Best Motion Picture – Musical or Comedy | | Nominated | |
| Golden Globe Awards | Best Actor in a Motion Picture – Musical or Comedy | Fred Astaire | Nominated | |
| Golden Globe Awards | Best Actress in a Motion Picture – Musical or Comedy | Petula Clark | Nominated | |
| Golden Globe Awards | Best Supporting Actress – Motion Picture | Barbara Hancock | Nominated | |
| Golden Globe Awards | Most Promising Newcomer – Female | Barbara Hancock | Nominated | |
| Golden Reel Awards | Best Sound Editing – Dialogue | | Won | |
| Laurel Awards | Top Female New Face | Petula Clark | 7th Place | |
| Writers Guild of America Awards | Best Written American Musical | E. Y. Harburg and Fred Saidy | Nominated | |

The song, "How Are Things in Glocca Morra?", was nominated by the American Film Institute in its 2004 list AFI's 100 Years...100 Songs.

=== Home media ===
The film was released on DVD March 15, 2005. Presented in anamorphic widescreen format, the release captured Astaire's footwork, much of which was unseen at the time of the original release because it had been cropped out during a conversion from 35mm to 70mm film.

There are audio tracks in English and French, with both the dialogue and songs translated to the latter (fluent in French, Clark was the sole cast member to record her own songs for the foreign version of the film); a commentary track by Francis Ford Coppola, who in hindsight was critical of his work on the film; a featurette on the world premiere of the film; and the original theatrical trailer.

The film was released on Blu-ray March 7, 2017.

== See also ==
- List of American films of 1968
