= Boy, Girl, and Island =

"Boy, Girl, and Island" is a 1957 American popular song with lyrics by Yip Harburg and music by Harold Arlen. Originally written for the musical Jamaica, the song was cut before the show's Broadway opening and replaced by the song "Take It Slow, Joe" in an attempt to tighten the show's plot line. Although Lena Horne's performance of the replacement song was generally praised, the show, with or without "Boy, Girl, and Island," was criticized for a weak plot.

== Recordings ==
- The Island Boys perform the song on their 1958 LP "Go Calypso" (Kapp KL-1057), although it is not one of the 6 songs on their 45 singles with the same title.
