= 26th Golden Globe Awards =

Film award ceremony in 1969

- Date: February 24, 1969

The 26th Golden Globe Awards, honoring the best in film and television for 1968, were held on February 24, 1969.

== Winners and nominees ==
=== Film ===
Best Motion Picture
Drama	Comedy or Musical
The Lion in Winter; Charly; The Fixer; The Heart Is a Lonely Hunter; The Shoes of the Fisherman	Oliver!; Finian's Rainbow; Funny Girl; The Odd Couple; Yours, Mine and Ours
Best Performance in a Motion Picture – Drama
Actor	Actress
Peter O'Toole - The Lion in Winter as King Henry II; Alan Arkin - The Heart Is a Lonely Hunter as John Singer; Alan Bates - The Fixer as Yakov Bok; Tony Curtis - The Boston Strangler as Albert DeSalvo; Cliff Robertson - Charly as Charlie Gordon	Joanne Woodward - Rachel, Rachel as Rachel Cameron; Mia Farrow - Rosemary's Baby as Rosemary Woodhouse; Katharine Hepburn - The Lion in Winter as Queen Eleanor of Aquitaine; Vanessa Redgrave - Isadora as Isadora Duncan; Beryl Reid - The Killing of Sister George as June "George" Buckridge
Best Performance in a Motion Picture – Comedy or Musical
Actor	Actress
Ron Moody - Oliver! as Fagin; Fred Astaire - Finian's Rainbow as Finian McLonergan; Jack Lemmon - The Odd Couple as Felix Ungar; Walter Matthau - The Odd Couple as Oscar Madison; Zero Mostel - The Producers as Max Bialystock	Barbra Streisand - Funny Girl as Fanny Brice; Julie Andrews - Star! as Gertrude Lawrence; Lucille Ball - Yours, Mine and Ours as Helen North; Petula Clark - Finian's Rainbow as Sharon McLongeran; Gina Lollobrigida - Buona Sera, Mrs. Campbell as Carla Campbell
Best Supporting Performance in a Motion Picture – Drama, Comedy or Musical
Supporting Actor	Supporting Actress
Daniel Massey - Star! as Noël Coward; Beau Bridges - For Love of Ivy as Tim Austin; Ossie Davis - The Scalphunters as Joseph Lee; Hugh Griffith - The Fixer as Lebedev; Hugh Griffith - Oliver! as the Magistrate; Martin Sheen - The Subject Was Roses as Timmy Cleary	Ruth Gordon - Rosemary's Baby as Minnie Castevet; Barbara Hancock - Finian's Rainbow as Susan the Silent; Abbey Lincoln - For Love of Ivy as Ivy Moore; Sondra Locke - The Heart Is a Lonely Hunter as Mick Kelly; Jane Merrow - The Lion in Winter as Alais
Other
Best Director	Best Screenplay
Paul Newman - Rachel, Rachel; Anthony Harvey - The Lion in Winter; Carol Reed - Oliver!; William Wyler - Funny Girl; Franco Zeffirelli - Romeo and Juliet	Charly - Stirling Silliphant; The Fixer - Dalton Trumbo; The Lion in Winter - James Goldman; The Producers - Mel Brooks; Rosemary's Baby - Roman Polanski
Best Original Score	Best Original Song
The Shoes of the Fisherman - Alex North; Chitty Chitty Bang Bang - Sherman Brothers; The Lion in Winter - John Barry; Oliver! - Lionel Bart (declared ineligible and removed from ballot.); Romeo and Juliet - Nino Rota; Rosemary's Baby - Krzysztof Komeda; The Thomas Crown Affair - Michel Legrand	"The Windmills of Your Mind" (Alan and Marilyn Bergman, Michel Legrand) - The Thomas Crown Affair; "Buona Sera, Mrs. Campbell" (Riz Ortolani, Melvin Frank) - Buona Sera, Mrs. Campbell; "Chitty Chitty Bang Bang" (Sherman Brothers) - Chitty Chitty Bang Bang; "Funny Girl" (Jule Styne, Bob Merrill) - Funny Girl; "Star" (Michel Legrand, Jimmy Van Heusen, Sammy Cahn) - Star!
Best Foreign Film (English Language)	Best Foreign Film (Foreign Language)
Romeo and Juliet (Italy/United Kingdom); Benjamin (France); Buona Sera, Mrs. Campbell (United Kingdom); Joanna (United Kingdom); Poor Cow (United Kingdom)	War and Peace (USSR); The Bride Wore Black (France); I Even Met Happy Gypsies (Yugoslavia); Shame (Sweden); Stolen Kisses (France)
New Star of the Year – Actor	New Star of the Year – Actress
Leonard Whiting - Romeo and Juliet as Romeo Montague; Alan Alda - Paper Lion as George Plimpton; Daniel Massey - Star! as Noël Coward; Michael Sarrazin - The Sweet Ride as Denny McGuire; Jack Wild - Oliver! as The Artful Dodger	Olivia Hussey - Romeo and Juliet as Juliet Capulet; Ewa Aulin - Candy as Candy; Jacqueline Bisset - The Sweet Ride as Vickie Cartwright; Barbara Hancock - Finian's Rainbow as Susan the Silent; Sondra Locke - The Heart Is a Lonely Hunter as Mick Kelly; Leigh Taylor-Young - I Love You, Alice B. Toklas as Nancy

The following films received multiple nominations:

Nominations	Title
7	The Lion in Winter
5	Finian's Rainbow
5	Oliver!
5	Romeo and Juliet
4	Funny Girl
4	The Heart Is a Lonely Hunter
4	Rosemary's Baby
4	Star!
3	Buona Sera, Mrs. Campbell
3	Charly
3	The Fixer
3	The Odd Couple
2	Chitty Chitty Bang Bang
2	For Love of Ivy
2	The Producers
2	Rachel, Rachel
2	The Shoes of the Fisherman
2	The Sweet Ride
2	The Thomas Crown Affair
2	Yours, Mine and Ours

The following films received multiple wins:

Wins	Title
3	Romeo and Juliet
2	The Lion in Winter
2	Oliver!
2	Rachel, Rachel

=== Television ===
Best Television Series
Rowan & Martin's Laugh-In: The Carol Burnett Show; The Doris Day Show; Julia; The Name of the Game
Best Performance in a Television Series
Actor	Actress
Carl Betz - Judd, for the Defense as Clinton Judd: Raymond Burr - Ironside as Robert T. Ironside; Peter Graves - Mission: Impossible as Jim Phelps; Dean Martin - The Dean Martin Show as Himself; Efrem Zimbalist Jr. - The F.B.I. as Lewis Erskine	Diahann Carroll - Julia as Julia Baker: Doris Day - The Doris Day Show as Doris Martin; Hope Lange - The Ghost & Mrs. Muir as Carolyn Muir; Elizabeth Montgomery - Bewitched as Samantha Stephens; Nancy Sinatra - The Nancy Sinatra Show as Various Characters

The following programs received multiple nominations:

Nominations	Title
2	The Doris Day Show
2	Julia

=== Cecil B. DeMille Award ===
Gregory Peck
