= Finian's Rainbow =

1947 Broadway musical

- Original Broadway Playbill
- Music: Burton Lane
- Lyrics: E. Y. Harburg
- Book: E. Y. Harburg; Fred Saidy
- Productions: 1947 Broadway; 1947 West End mid-1950s animated film (unfinished); 1955 Broadway revival 1960 Broadway revival 1967 Broadway revival 1968 Film; 2004 Off-Broadway; 2009 Encores! concert 2009 Broadway revival 2014 Off-West End revival

Finian's Rainbow is a musical with a book by E. Y. Harburg and Fred Saidy, lyrics by Harburg, and music by Burton Lane, produced by Lee Sabinson. The original 1947 Broadway production ran for 725 performances, while a film version was released in 1968 and several revivals have followed.

An elderly Irishman, Finian McLonergan, moves to the southern United States with his daughter Sharon, to bury a stolen pot of gold near Fort Knox, in the mistaken belief that it will make him prosperous, as he imagines that the gold which he thinks has been buried at Fort Knox has made America prosperous. Og, a leprechaun, follows them, desperate to recover his treasure before the loss of it turns him permanently human. Complications arise when a bigoted and corrupt U.S. senator gets involved, and when wishes are made inadvertently over the hidden crock. The Irish-tinged music score includes gospel and R&B influences.

== Synopsis ==
=== Act I ===
The play opens in Rainbow Valley, Missitucky (a fictitious blend of Mississippi and Kentucky), near Fort Knox, home of a mixture of Black and White tobacco sharecroppers. The local sheriff and Buzz Collins, front man for local senator Billboard Rawkins, demand the locals pay their taxes or else have their land auctioned off. The sharecroppers want to wait for Woody Mahoney, their union leader. Woody's mute sister Susan the Silent communicates through dancing that Woody will bring the money, while a boy named Henry translates her dance for Collins and the sheriff. The sheriff begins the auction, but the sharecroppers refuse to listen and drag him and Collins off to meet Woody ("This Time of Year"). As they leave, an elderly Irishman called Finian McLonergan arrives with his daughter Sharon. They have come looking for Rainbow Valley, but Sharon misses their home in Ireland ("How Are Things in Glocca Morra"). Finian explains to Sharon that American millionaires convert their wealth into gold and bury it near Fort Knox. He concludes it is the soil in and around Fort Knox that makes the US rich, and reveals that he has a crock of gold stolen from a leprechaun, which he intends to bury. Woody and the sharecroppers reenter, and when Woody doesn't have enough money to pay the interest on the taxes, Finian pays the rest. Finian and Sharon are welcomed by the sharecroppers. Sharon explains her father's philosophy of following one's dream ("Look to the Rainbow").

That night, Finian buries the gold and marks the spot, only to be met by Og, the leprechaun he stole from. Without his gold, Og is slowly becoming mortal, and needs it back. Sharon and Woody come looking for Finian, but are soon distracted by the moonlight and each other ("Old Devil Moon").

Senator Rawkins is buying up land to fight progressive developers. He is not upset with losing Rainbow Valley until two geologists arrive to tell him gold has been detected in it. He vows to drive Finian and the sharecroppers off.

The next morning, Og meets Sharon and shyly confesses his feelings for her ("Something Sort of Grandish"). Sharon is in love with Woody, however, and Finian slyly prevents Woody from leaving for New York by making him suspect that another man is pursuing Sharon. The sharecroppers celebrate the unofficial betrothal of Sharon and Woody ("If This Isn't Love"). Og arrives and tells Finian he loves Sharon. He also warns Finian not to make wishes near the gold - after three wishes, the gold will vanish forever. Og enlists the local children to help find his gold, promising to get them anything from a magical catalogue ("Something Sort of Grandish [Reprise]").

As the sharecroppers sort the tobacco leaves, Maude, one of their leaders, explains the general unfairness of life to them ("Necessity"). Senator Rawkins arrives informing Finian and the sharecroppers that, by living with black people, they are breaking the law and must leave. Outraged at the Senator's bigotry, Sharon tells him 'I wish to God you were black!' while unknowingly standing over the gold. The Senator is transformed into a black man and chased off the property by the Sheriff, who is unaware of the transformation. Woody brings news to Rainbow Valley that there is gold on their land, and the Shears-Robust shipping company has offered them all a free charge account. Insisting that credit is better than wealth, Woody and Finian tell them to use their new free credit rather than dig the gold. The group celebrates "That Great Come-and-get-it Day".

=== Act II ===
The sharecroppers begin unpacking extravagant gifts to themselves from their new accounts. Sharon and Finian celebrate the end of class-distinction that comes with wealth ("When the Idle Poor Become the Idle Rich"). Shears and Robust show up wondering when the gold will be discovered that will pay for the credit. Woody and Finian explain that there is no need to dig the gold up, since the news has led to massive investment in their tobacco label. Buzz and the Sheriff, however, accuse Sharon of using witchcraft to turn the Senator black. Woody orders them off. He and Sharon agree to marry ("Old Devil Moon [Reprise]"). Susan the Silent watches them, and dances by herself, and discovers the hidden gold ("Dance of the Hidden Crock"). She takes the gold for herself and hides it.

Meanwhile, the still-black Senator Rawkins is hiding in the woods. He meets Og and explains what happened to him. Og decides what the Senator needs is a new inside rather than a new outside. He uses his own magic to make the Senator a nicer person ("Fiddle Faddle"). In his new persona, Rawkins falls in with a group of black gospel singers looking for a fourth man ("The Begat"); by chance, they are all going to sing at Woody and Sharon's wedding. The wedding is interrupted by Buzz and the Sheriff, who have come to arrest her for witchcraft. The Senator tries to defend Woody and Sharon, but as a black man he lacks any authority over the Sheriff. Finian steps in, promising Sharon can change the Senator back. He dismisses everyone, intending to use the crock to undo her wish, but finds the crock gone.

Og, now almost human, looks for Sharon to tell her his feelings. He finds Susan instead, but realizes he is also attracted to her. He wonders if all human love is so fickle ("When I'm Not Near the Girl I Love"). Finian finds them and tells them Sharon is in danger. When Og reveals he doesn't have the gold, Finian runs off in despair. Susan knows where the gold is, but can't speak. Frustrated, Og wishes she could talk, not knowing the gold is under his feet. Susan speaks, and tells him she loves him. Og realizes there is only one wish left, and if he uses it to save Sharon, he cannot be a leprechaun again. He is unsure what to do until Susan kisses him. Deciding being human isn't so bad, Og wishes the Senator white again.

The Senator promises to be a better representative to the people, and the sharecroppers welcome Og and the now-verbal Susan ("If This Isn't Love [Reprise]"). Finian, however, has lost the crock and his hope of getting rich. Seeing that Sharon and Og have found their dreams, he goes off again in search of his own rainbow, saying 'Maybe there's no pot of gold at the end of it, but there's a beautiful new world under it.' The cast tells him goodbye, promising to see him in Glocca Morra ("Finale").

== Production history ==
=== Original productions in New York and London ===
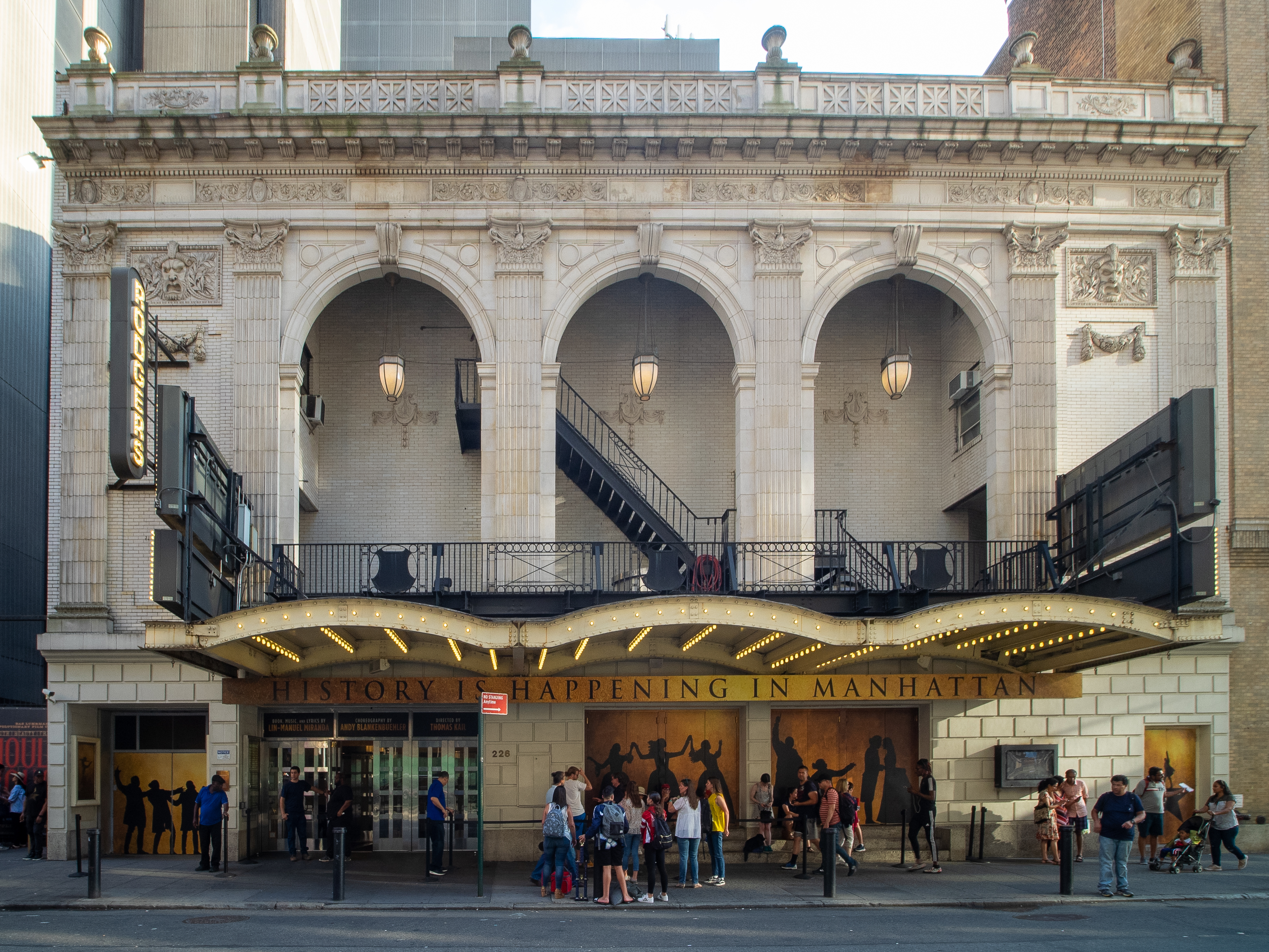
Broadway's 46th Street Theatre, where Finian's Rainbow premiered in 1947

The original Broadway production opened on January 10, 1947, at the 46th Street Theatre, where it ran for 725 performances. It was directed by Bretaigne Windust and choreographed by Michael Kidd, with orchestrations by Robert Russell Bennett and Don Walker. The cast included Ella Logan as Sharon, Donald Richards as Woody, Albert Sharpe as Finian, with the Lyn Murray Singers. For his performance as Og, David Wayne won both the Theatre World Award for outstanding Broadway debut performance and the first Tony Award ever given to a musical theatre performer. The show also would receive Tonys for Best Conductor and musical director for Milton Rosenstock and Best Choreography for Kidd.

A London production opened at the Palace Theatre on October 21, 1947, running for merely 55 performances.

=== Revivals from 1955 to 2004 ===
Finian's Rainbow was revived three times on Broadway by the New York City Center Light Opera Company. The brief 1955 production, directed by William Hammerstein and choreographed by Onna White, starred Helen Gallagher, Merv Griffin, and Will Mahoney, who was nominated for a Tony as Best Featured Actor in a Musical at the 10th Tony Awards. In 1960, Herbert Ross directed and choreographed a cast that included Jeannie Carson, Bobby Howes, Howard Morris, Sorrell Booke, and Robert Guillaume. A third revival was staged by the company in 1967. Major revivals of the musical were rare until the 2009 Broadway revival, as the musical's criticisms of bigotry against Black people in the American South had become dated, having been written before the modern Civil Rights movement and referring to forgotten political figures. However, in 2004 the Irish Repertory Theatre staged a well-received off-Broadway production starring Melissa Errico, Jonathan Freeman, and Malcolm Gets.

=== Film adaptations ===
In 1954, an animated film adaptation began production, directed by John Hubley. The crew included Art Babbit, Bill Tytla and Paul Julian. Among the cast were Frank Sinatra, Ella Fitzgerald, Oscar Peterson, Louis Armstrong, Barry Fitzgerald, Jim Backus and David Burns plus David Wayne and Ella Logan from the original Broadway production. The era's McCarthyism caused financing to be withdrawn due to Hubley and Harburg's refusal to testify before the House Committee on Un-American Activities. Pre-production artwork, sketches from the storyboard, character designs, the script and some of the soundtrack recording have been recovered. Examples of the art and designs were published in the March/April 1993 issue of Print to illustrate an article by animation historian John Canemaker about the backstory of the project.

A 1968 film version with Fred Astaire, Tommy Steele, Petula Clark and Don Francks was directed by Francis Ford Coppola.

=== 2009 Encores! Concert and Broadway revival ===
New York's City Center Encores! series performed a concert version of the musical from March 26, 2009, through March 29. Directed and choreographed by Warren Carlyle, it starred Jim Norton and Kate Baldwin as Finian and Sharon, with Cheyenne Jackson as Woody, Grammy nominated Blues artist Guy Davis as the blind harmonica-playing share cropper, and Jeremy Bobb as Og, the leprechaun.

A fully staged Broadway revival opened at the St. James Theatre on October 29, 2009, with most of the Encores! cast and director-choreographer Carlyle returning. Notable replacements to the cast were Christopher Fitzgerald as Og the leprechaun, David Schramm as Senator Rawkins and Chuck Cooper as Rawkins transformed into a black man. Ernest Harburg, Yip Harburg's son and president of the Harburg Foundation, said "The satire of our economic system is particularly relevant right now [2009], given the nation’s deep financial woes."

The producers closed the show on January 17, 2010, stating that the "economic realities of Broadway today" did not allow them to play for as long as they had hoped. The production sold approximately two-thirds of its seats for the 15-week run. Garth Drabinsky offered to try to rescue the revival and secure Canadian tour commitments, but the producers rejected his proposal.

The show was nominated for 2010 Tony Awards for Best Revival of a Musical, Best Actress in a Musical (Baldwin) and Best Featured Actor in a Musical (Fitzgerald) at the 64th Tony Awards.

=== 2014 London Fringe and Off-West End Revival ===
A fully staged London revival opened at the Union Theatre on February 12 – March 15, 2014. This production was directed by Phil Willmott and musically directed by Richard Baker, with choreography by Thomas Michael Voss, and starred James Horne as Finian, Christina Bennington as Sharon, Joseph Peters as Woody, Raymond Walsh as Og and Anne Odeke as Sister Anne and Rawkin's maid. The production later moved to the Charing Cross Theatre between April 2 and May 10 with the majority of the same cast and crew.

=== 2016 Off-Broadway Revival ===
A fully staged revival, adapted and directed by Charlotte Moore, ran at the Irish Repertory Theatre in New York City from October 26, 2016, until January 29, 2017. The cast included Ken Jennings as Finian, Melissa Errico as Sharon, Ryan Silverman as Woody, Mark Evans as Og, Lyrica Woodruff as Susan and Dewey Caddell as Senator Rawkins.

== Song list ==
Act I

- "Overture" – Orchestra
- "This Time of the Year" – Ensemble
- "How Are Things in Glocca Morra?" – Sharon McLonergan
- "Look to the Rainbow" – Sharon McLonergan and Ensemble
- "Old Devil Moon" – Sharon McLonergan and Woody Mahoney
- "How Are Things in Glocca Morra?" (Reprise) – Sharon McLonergan
- "Something Sort of Grandish" – Sharon McLonergan and Og
- "If This Isn't Love" – Sharon McLonergan, Woody Mahoney and Ensemble
- "Something Sort of Grandish" (Reprise) – Og
- "Necessity" – Delores Martin, The Lyn Murray Singers, and Maude Simmons
- "That Great 'Come-and-Get-It' Day" – Sharon McLonergan, Woody Mahoney and Ensemble

Act II

- "When the Idle Poor Become the Idle Rich" – Sharon McLonergan and Ensemble
- "Old Devil Moon" (Reprise) – Sharon McLonergan and Woody Mahoney
- "Fiddle Faddle" – Og
- "The Begat" – Senator Billboard Rawkins and Gospeleers
- "Look to the Rainbow" (Reprise) – Sharon McLonergan, Woody Mahoney and Ensemble
- "When I'm Not Near the Girl I Love" – Og and Susan Mahoney
- "If This Isn't Love" (Reprise) – Ensemble
- "Finale" – Company

== Casts (1940s–1970s) ==
Character	Original Broadway Production	Original West End Production	US National Tour	Pittsburgh Civic Light Opera Production	City Center Revival	The Muny Production	Broadway Revival	City Center Revival	Kenley Players Production	Film Version	Melody Top Theatre Production	Chanhassen Dinner Theatre Production	Jones Beach Theater Production	The Muny Production	Pittsburgh Civic Light Opera Production
Character	1947-1948	1947	1948	1951	1955	1958	1960	1967		1968	1974	1977			
Finian McLonergan	Albert Sharpe	Patrick J. Kelly	Joe Yule	Patrick J. Kelly	Will Mahoney	Will Mahoney	Bobby Howes	Frank McHugh	Jack Eddleman	Fred Astaire	Charles Welch	J. C. Hoyt	Christopher Hewett	Gordon Connell	Ian Martin
Sharon McLonergan	Ella Logan	Beryl Seton	Mimi Kelly	Marlilyn Day	Helen Gallagher	Virginia Gibson	Jeannie Carson	Nancy Dussault	Barbara Eden	Petula Clark	Barbara Williams	Jane Murray	Beth Fowler	Nancy Dussault	Barbara Lang
Woody Mahoney	Donald Richards	Alan Gilbert	Jay Martin	Harry Stockwell	Merv Griffin	Jack Washburn	Biff McGuire	Stanley Grover	Don McKay	Don Francks	David Holliday	Dominic Castino	Stanley Grover	Ron Husmann	Lawrence Keith
Og	David Wayne	Alfie Bass	Charles Davis	Philip Truex	Donn Driver	Tim Herbert	Howard Morris	Len Gochman	Rudy Tronto	Tommy Steele	Arte Johnson	Ted Chase	Charles Repole	Paul Williams	?
Senator Billboard Rawkins	Robert Pitkin	Frank Royde	Robert Pitkin	Norman Roland	Frank Borgman	Arthur Tell	Sorrell Booke	Howard Smith	Dean Dittmann	Keenan Wynn	Zale Kessler	Bernard Erhard	Ronn Carroll	Charles Rule	?
Dottie	—N/a	—N/a	—N/a	—N/a	—N/a	—N/a	Carol Brice (as Maude)	Carol Brice (as Maude)	—N/a	—N/a	—N/a	—N/a	—N/a	—N/a	—N/a
Susan Mahoney	Anita Alvarez	Beryl Kaye	Carmen Guterez	Pearl Lang	Anita Alvarez	Claiborne Cary	Carmen Gutierrez	Sandy Duncan	Roxanne Ebner	Barbara Hancock	Tracy Friedman	Bonnie Zimering	Gail Benedict	Sharon Halley	?
Buzz Collins	Eddie Bruce	Edgar Driver	Eddie Bruce	Eddie Bruce	Eddie Bruce	Eddie Bruce	Eddie Bruce	Ronn Carroll	Leslie Cutler	Ronald Colby	Clyde Laurents	Richard Ashford	Alan North	James Paul	?
Sheriff	Tom McElhany	Toby Lenon	John Robb	Jerry Goff	John Bryan	Edmund Lyndeck	Judson Morgan	Howard Fischer	Charles Cagle	Dolph Sweet	Clyde Miller	James Horswill	John Dorrin	Bill Atwood	?
Sunny	Sonny Terry	—N/a	—N/a	Harry O'Day	—N/a	Tas Karides	—N/a	Elliot Levine	—N/a	—N/a	—N/a	—N/a	Raymond Townsend	—N/a	James Agnew
Henry	Augustus Smith Jr.	John Norris	James Grimes	Tom Crater	Michael Gilford	Evan Richardson	Michael Darden	Kevin Featherstone	Nate Barnett	Louil Silas	—N/a	—N/a	Winston Roye	—N/a	David Carl
Diana	Diane Woods	Patricia Downs	Julie Gay	Juanita Broadus	Lynn-Rose Kohan	Carol Jean Wilson	Patty Austin	Ellen Huggins	—N/a	—N/a	—N/a	—N/a	Robbi Smith	—N/a	—N/a

=== Notable Replacements ===
==== Original Broadway Production (1947–1948) ====
- Finian McLonergan: Joe Yule, Ian Martin
- Sharon McLonergan: Nan Wynn, Dorothy Claire, Kitty Kallen
- Og: Harry Townes, Charles Davis (u/s)
- Susan Mahoney: Pearl Lang
- Sheriff: Royal Dano (u/s)

==== US National Tour (1948–1949) ====
- Finian McLonergan: Russ Brown
- Woody Mahoney: Harry Stockwell

== Casts (1980s-2020s) ==
Character	BBC Radio Production	Goodspeed Musicals Production	Reprise Theatre Company Production	US Pre-Broadway Tour	Irish Repertory Theatre Concert	Irish Repertory Theatre Production	Walnut Street Theatre Production	Encores! Production	Broadway Revival	Irish Repertory Theatre Production
Character	1994	1997		1999	2003	2004	2005	2009	2009-2010	2016
Finian McLonergan	Milo O'Shea	James Judy	Biff McGuire	Brian Murray	John Cullum	Jonathan Freeman	Ian D. Clark	Jim Norton	Jim Norton	Ken Jennings
Sharon McLonergan	Janie Dee	Erin Dilly	Andrea Marcovicci	Kate Jennings Grant	Melissa Errico	Melissa Errico	Jennifer Hope Wills	Kate Baldwin	Kate Baldwin	Melissa Errico
Woody Mahoney	Tim Flavin	David M. Lutken	Rex Smith	J. Robert Spencer	Ciarán Sheehan	Max von Essen	Don Burroughs	Cheyenne Jackson	Cheyenne Jackson	Ryan Silverman
Og	Brian Murray	Robert Creighton	Malcolm Gets	Denis O'Hare	Denis O'Hare	Malcolm Gets	Christopher Sutton	Jeremy Bobb	Christopher Fitzgerald	Mark Evans
Senator Billboard Rawkins	David Healy	Ron Wisniski	Robert Mandan Jeff Coopwood	Austin Pendleton	Don Sparks	John Sloman	Mike O'Carroll	Philip Bosco Ruben Santiago-Hudson	David Schramm Chuck Cooper	Dewey Caddell
Dottie	—N/a	—N/a	Cleo King (as Necessity Lady)	Terri White	Terri White	Terri White	—N/a	Terri White	Terri White	Kimberly Doreen Burns
Susan Mahoney	—N/a	Jennifer Paulson Lee	Susan Stackpole	Tina Ou	Tina Ou	Kimberly Dawn Neumann	Lyndy Franklin	Alina Faye	Alina Faye	Lyrica Woodruff
Buzz Collins	Dan Russell	Bill Kocis	Kevin Cooney	Don Stephenson	Joshua Park	—N/a	Dan Olmstead	William Youmans	William Youmans	Matt Gibson
Sheriff	David Kelsey	Beeson Carroll	—N/a	Andrew Boyer	—N/a	—N/a	Greg Wood	Andy Weems	Brian Reddy	Peyton Crim
Sunny	—N/a	Jasper McGruder	—N/a	Eric Riley	—N/a	David Staller	Steven Anthony Wright	Guy Davis	Guy Davis	—N/a
Henry	—N/a	Jamal James	—N/a	Cyrus Akeem Brooks	—N/a	—N/a	Hasani Allen	—N/a	Christopher Borger	—N/a
Diana	—N/a	Kyra Little	—N/a	Rosa Janae Lee	—N/a	—N/a	Ashley Arnold	—N/a	Paige Simunovich	—N/a

=== Notable Replacements ===
==== Irish Repertory Theatre Production (2004) ====
- Sharon McLonergan: Kerry O'Malley
- Og: Chad Kimball

==== Broadway Revival (2009-2010) ====
- Finian McLonergan: William Youmans (u/s)
- Woody Mahoney: Taylor Frey (u/s)

==== Irish Repertory Theatre Production (2016-2017) ====
- Woody Mahoney: Jeremiah James

== Awards and nominations ==
=== Original Broadway production ===
Year	Award	Category	Nominee	Result
1947	Tony Award	Best Performance by a Featured Actor in a Musical	David Wayne	Won
1947	Tony Award	Best Choreography	Michael Kidd	Won
1948	Tony Award	Best Conductor and Musical Director	Milton Rosenstock	Won
1947	Theatre World Award		David Wayne	Won

=== 1955 Broadway revival ===
Year	Award	Category	Nominee	Result
1956	Tony Award	Best Performance by a Featured Actor in a Musical	Will Mahoney	Nominated

=== 2009 Broadway revival ===
Year	Award	Category	Nominee	Result
2010	Tony Award	Best Revival of a Musical		Nominated
2010	Tony Award	Best Performance by a Leading Actress in a Musical	Kate Baldwin	Nominated
2010	Tony Award	Best Performance by a Featured Actor in a Musical	Christopher Fitzgerald	Nominated
2010	Drama Desk Award	Outstanding Revival of a Musical		Nominated
2010	Drama Desk Award	Outstanding Actor in a Musical	Cheyenne Jackson	Nominated
2010	Drama Desk Award	Outstanding Actress in a Musical	Kate Baldwin	Nominated
2010	Drama Desk Award	Outstanding Featured Actor in a Musical	Christopher Fitzgerald	Won
2010	Drama Desk Award	Outstanding Featured Actress in a Musical	Terri White	Nominated
2010	Drama Desk Award	Outstanding Director of a Musical	Warren Carlyle	Nominated
2010	Drama Desk Award	Outstanding Choreography	Warren Carlyle	Nominated
2010	Drama Desk Award	Outstanding Sound Design	Scott Lehrer	Nominated
2010	Outer Critics Circle Award	Outstanding Revival of a Musical		Nominated
2010	Outer Critics Circle Award	Outstanding Actress in a Musical	Kate Baldwin	Nominated
2010	Outer Critics Circle Award	Outstanding Featured Actor in a Musical	Christopher Fitzgerald	Nominated
2010	Outer Critics Circle Award	Outstanding Featured Actress in a Musical	Terri White	Nominated

== Recording ==
An original cast recording released as a six-disc 78 rpm set by Columbia Records was the label's first recording of a Broadway musical. The label used the album to introduce its new LP format in June 1948. In 1988, the album was released on CD, and in 2000, a second CD version appeared that was remastered from the original acetates and restored some material originally recorded but cut from the show, including three bonus tracks in which Harburg discusses the writing of and sings "How Are Things in Glocca Morra?" and "When I'm Not Near the Girl I Love," as well as singing "Don't Pass Me By," a song cut from the show.

A recording of the original cast of the 1960 Broadway production, starring Jeannie Carson, Howard Morris, Biff McGuire, Carol Brice, Sorrell Booke and Bobby Howes was released on RCA Victor LSO-1057.

The 1963 Reprise Musical Repertory Theatre, a project of Frank Sinatra's Reprise Records, included a recording of the musical's songs by a variety of performers, though not in cast recording style.

In 1968 bandleader Stan Kenton released Finian's Rainbow featuring big band interpretations of tunes from the show.

A cast recording of the 2009 revival was recorded on December 7 by PS Classics and released on February 2, 2010.
