= Flahooley =

- Capitol Records Album Cover for Flahooley
- Music: Sammy Fain
- Lyrics: E. Y. Harburg
- Book: E. Y. Harburg; Fred Saidy
- Productions: 1951 Broadway 1998 Off-Off Broadway

Flahooley is a musical with a book by E. Y. Harburg and Fred Saidy, lyrics by Harburg, and music by Sammy Fain.

== Synopsis and background ==
The allegorical tale is set in fictional Capsulanti, USA, site of the headquarters for B.G. Bigelow, Incorporated, the largest toy corporation in the world. Puppet designer Sylvester has created laughing doll Flahooley and is about to unveil it as the company's big Christmas release to the board of directors. The meeting is interrupted by an Arabian delegation. Their country has run out of oil, the magic lamp upon which they rely is broken, and they hope someone can repair it so genie Abou Ben Atom, who keeps things running smoothly, will reappear and help them in their time of need. Bigelow, enamored with Princess Najla, agrees and assigns Sylvester to the project. Sylvester's hopes of success are crushed when a rival company produces their own doll at a lower price. By rubbing the lamp with Flahooley's hand, he summons the genie, and, hoping to become wealthy enough to marry his model Sandy, wishes for every child to have a Flahooley doll. Unfortunately the genie, unclear on the concept of capitalism, begins giving away thousands of dolls, causing warehouses to collapse and children to carry them off for free. Before long a full-fledged witch-hunt is on for him in an effort to put an end to his misguided generosity. The mob's leader Elsa Bullinger urges citizens to destroy every doll they find. This destructive behavior begins to kill Abou, until Sandy is able to save one doll and fix it again, reviving the genie. The lamp, however, has been captured by Elsa. Abou decides not to return to the lamp, but to become a real-life Santa Claus and gives his blessing to Sylvester and Sandy, urging everyone to believe in what Flahooley represents.

Harburg had successfully blended politics with fantasy in Finian's Rainbow four years earlier, but his bitterness at his 1950 Hollywood blacklisting, which prompted him to write Flahooley, permeated the project. During its evolution he conceded to some adjustments - originally the doll, instead of laughing, yelled "Dirty Red!" when turned upside down - but his convoluted plot still included too many thinly veiled references to Joseph McCarthy and his followers, and his harsh parody of the ongoing rabid anti-Communist sentiment that prompted so many witch hunts was not softened by the inclusion of a genie and singing puppets. It did not help that associate producer/director Harburg saw no need to edit writer Harburg's overstated political views.

== Production ==
The Broadway production was directed by Harburg and Saidy, choreographed by Helen Tamiris, and orchestrated by Ted Royal. It opened on May 14, 1951 at the Broadhurst Theatre, where it closed on June 15, 1951 after 40 performances. This was due to Seventeen taking over the Broadhurst theatre. It was announced that the show would reopen with revisions, but it never did. The cast included Jerome Courtland as Sylvester, Ernest Truex as Bigelow, Barbara Cook (in her Broadway debut) as Sandy, Irwin Corey as Abou Ben Atom, and Yma Sumac as Princess Najla, with Louis Nye, Nehemiah Persoff, and Ted Thurston in supporting roles. Bil Baird and his wife Cora played small roles in addition to creating and controlling the marionettes that performed "You Too Can Be a Puppet," the opening number that took a swipe at McCarthy's minions and set the tone for the rest of the evening, although by the time the show opened in New York, several songs and much of the more pointed satire was severely toned down or removed during the out of town tryouts.

An original cast recording was released by Capitol Records.

== Revisions ==
A revised version of the show, retitled Jollyanna, and with a few new songs composed by Burton Lane, was produced by the San Francisco Civic Light Opera in August 1952. The Los Angeles Civic Light Opera presented a second revision, retitled The Little Doll Laughed, in the same year.

== Revival productions ==
In 1998, a production of Flahooley (the first in New York since its original brief run) was mounted at the Theatre At St. Clement's. Adapted and directed by Alisa Roost with choreography and directorial contributions by Al Joyal, and orchestration and musical direction by Peter Jones this 1998 revival production had some participation from the heirs of the original creative team. This allowed restoration of songs and other material, which was excised from the original production during its out of town tryouts (including the melodic and ironic indictment of the commercialization of Christmas, "Sing The Merry"). Following the original book, the doll exclaimed "Dirty Red!" instead of laughing, went to sleep when you fed it phenobarbital, woke up when you fed it benzedrine (a drug also referenced in Finian's Rainbow) and had the stated purpose of teaching children how to be good Americans. The principal cast of the revival production included April Allen, Mark Cortale, Christopher Budnich, Natalie Buster, Clay Hansen, Alan Semok, Cheryl Walsh, Roxy Becker, Mimi Ferraro, J. Michael Zally and Tiffany Card.

There have been two London productions by the Lost Musicals project, aka The Lost Musicals Charitable Trust 1069268. The first was in 1997 at the Barbican Centre. Ian Marshall Fisher, director, Mark Dorell, Music Director, with the cast that included Alan Cox. This was repeated in Sadler's Wells in 2012 ( Music Director and musicologist Mark Warman).

== Song list ==
Act I

- You Too Can Be a Puppet
- Here's To Your Illusions
- B.G. Bigelow, Inc.
- Najla's Song
- Who Says There Ain't No Santa Claus
- Flahooley
- The World Is Your Balloon
- He's Only Wonderful
- Arabian For 'Get Happy'

Act II

- Spirit of Capsulanti
- Happy Hunting
- Enchantment
- Scheherezade
- Come Back, Little Genie
- The Springtime Cometh
