= Old Devil Moon =

1947 Broadway show tune

"Old Devil Moon" is a popular song composed by Burton Lane with lyrics by Yip Harburg for the 1947 musical Finian's Rainbow. It was introduced by Ella Logan and Donald Richards in the Broadway show. The song takes its title from a phrase in "Fun to Be Fooled", a song that Harburg wrote with Harold Arlen and Ira Gershwin for the 1934 musical Life Begins at 8:40.

In the 1968 film version, the song was performed by Don Francks and Petula Clark.

== Notable recordings ==
- Margaret Whiting - her single release reached the No. 11 spot in the Billboard charts in 1947.
- Gene Krupa and His Orchestra (vocal by Carolyn Grey) - this also reached the Billboard charts briefly in 1947 in the No. 21 position.
- Charlie Spivak feat. Margaret Manning - (1946)
- Miles Davis – Blue Haze (1954)
- Jack Pleis, His Piano, Orchestra and Chorus – Broadway Goes Hollywood (1955)
- Bob Dorough - Devil May Care (1956)
- Frank Sinatra on Songs for Swingin' Lovers! (1956)
- Morton Gould & His Orchestra - Blues in the Night (1957)
- Sonny Rollins - A Night at the Village Vanguard (1957)
- Anita O'Day - Anita Sings the Most (1957)
- Totlyn Jackson [with Lance Hayward] - Lance Hayward at the Half Moon (1958), Jamaica Jazz 1931-1962
- Lurlean Hunter - Stepping Out (1958)
- Peggy Lee - Jump for Joy (1958)
- Judy Garland - That's Entertainment (1960)
- Mel Torme - Mel Tormé Swings Shubert Alley (1960)
- McCoy Tyner Trio - Reaching Fourth (1962)
- Ahmad Jamal - Poinciana (1963)
- Ella Fitzgerald recorded it live in 1969 on her Sunshine of Your Love album.
- Nancy Sinatra - As vinyl 7" single / Reprise Records 0789 (1969). Also on her Nancy CD re-issue by Sundazed Music (1996) SC 6058
- Milt Jackson with Hubert Laws - Goodbye (1974)
- David Campbell - Taking the Wheel (1997)
- Jacky Terrasson and Cassandra Wilson - Rendezvous (1997)
- Rosemary Clooney - At Long Last (with the Count Basie Orchestra) (1998)
- Bobby Caldwell - Come Rain Or Come Shine (1999)
- Stan Kenton - At the Rendezvous, Vol 2 (2000) (vocal by Ann Richards)
- Jamie Cullum – Twentysomething (2003)
- Michael Feinstein & Cheyenne Jackson - The Power of Two (2009) (Cheyenne Jackson also starred as Woody in the 2009 revival of Finian's Rainbow)
- dodie - Chet Baker Re:imagined (2024)
