= Gary Shearston =

Australian singer-songwriter (1939–2013)

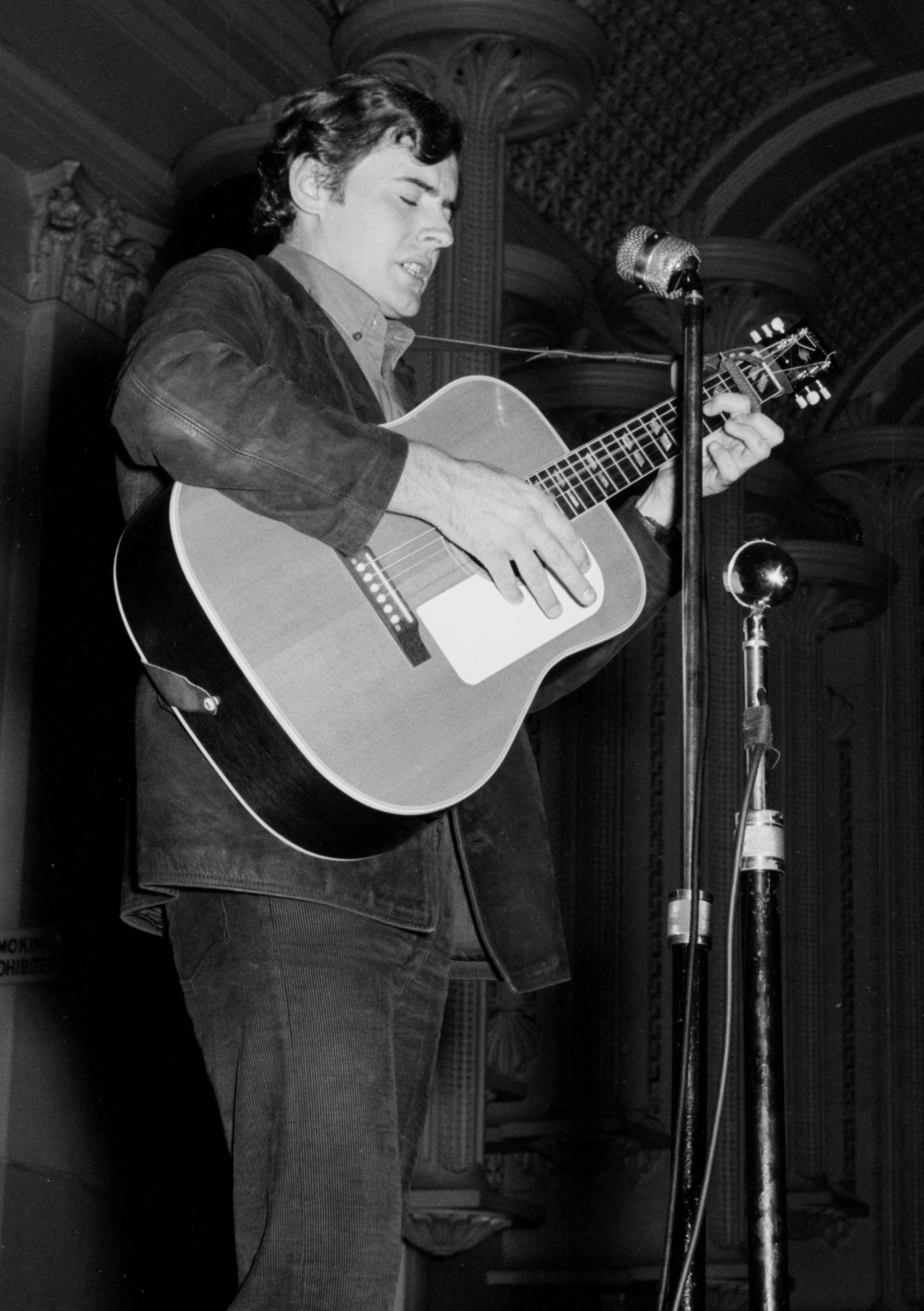
- Shearston at the SAFA Fundraiser, Paddington Town Hall, January 1965

Background information
- Born: Gary Rhett Shearston; 9 January 1939; Inverell, New South Wales, Australia
- Origin: Sydney, Australia
- Died: 1 July 2013 (aged 74) Armidale, New South Wales, Australia
- Genre: Folk
- Occupations: Singer-songwriter, priest
- Instruments: Vocals, guitar
- Years active: 1958–2013
- Labels: Leedon/Festival, CBS
- Website: garyshearston.com

Gary Rhett Shearston (9 January 1939 – 1 July 2013) was an Australian singer-songwriter and Anglican priest. He was a leading figure of the folk music revival of the 1960s and performed traditional folk songs in an authentic style. He scored a top 10 hit in the United Kingdom in 1974 with his cover version of Cole Porter's song "I Get a Kick out of You". From the 1990s he also worked as a priest in rural New South Wales.

== Early life ==
Shearston was born on 9 January 1939 in Inverell, New South Wales, Australia. He was the son of former equestrienne Audrey Lilian (née Petherick, later Manchee) and local shire councillor James Barclay Shearston. During World War II his father served both with the RAAF (1941) and Australian Army (1941–1946). Shearston and his mother moved to his maternal grandparents' property, "Ayrdrie", near Tenterfield, New South Wales for the rest of the war. By 1946 his parents had divorced. At the age of 11 his family moved to Sydney, where he attended his father's alma mater, Newington College (1950–1955), commencing as a preparatory school student at Wyvern House. He later studied at the Sydney Conservatorium.

== Career ==
Shearston left school at age 16 to train as a press correspondent with United Press, while his first show business job was as a puppeteer with the Tintookies (named for their 1956 play The Tintookies), an Australian travelling puppetry troupe. The company, with Shearston, performed Little Fella Bindi in theatres in Brisbane, Melbourne, Adelaide and Sydney from August to December 1958. Back in Sydney, he joined the Hayes Gordon Ensemble Theatre working as an actor in Orpheus Descending (January–July 1960) and The Drunkard (July 1960–February 1961) and as a stage manager. By February 1963 he had also appeared on TV shows, Bandstand, Teen Time and Name That Tune (Australian version). Having taken up acoustic guitar, Shearston learned a repertoire of English, American and Australian folk songs and at 19 become a professional singer. He worked in hotels and sang at The Folksinger and with the American gospel and blues singer Brother John Sellers.

In 1962 Shearston signed with Leedon Records, which issued his debut single "The Ballad of Thunderbolt" (May 1963) and a three-track extended play, The Man from Snowy River (1963). Neither release sold well but they raised his local profile. Late in 1963 he was signed to the Australian division of CBS Records by A&R manager Sven Libaek. CBS issued his debut album, Folk Songs & Ballads of Australia, in April 1964. For the album Shearston sang and played guitar and harmonica; he was accompanied by Les Miller on guitar and banjo.

With political activist and poet Oodgeroo Noonuccal (a.k.a. Kath Walker) he co-wrote "We Want Freedom" (or "Aboriginal Charter of Rights") in 1964 to advocate for constitutional recognition of Indigenous Australians and their charter of rights. In March 1965 Sydney radio stations started playing "Sydney Town", a single from his second album Australian Broadside. It was co-written by Shearston with Australian writer Frank Hardy. It reached the top 10 in his home city and top 40 nationally. In 1966 and 1967, he was Australia's biggest record seller of folk music. Rather than adopting an English or American singing style, "What distinguished his records and performances was the Australian 'voice' Shearston chose to sing in."

Shearston had his own national television show, Just Folk (fl. 1965). United States folk trio Peter Paul and Mary toured Australia in mid-1964 and got a copy of a Shearston album – they later recorded a cover version of his track "Sometime Lovin'" (see The Peter, Paul and Mary Album, 1966). The group also invited him to the US. In 1967 he spent a year in London, while his US visa application was investigated, due to Australian Security Intelligence Organisation (ASIO) files regarding his protesting against Australian involvement in the Vietnam war and support for Federal Council for the Advancement of Aborigines and Torres Strait Islanders. He spent four years on the US east coast but was not allowed to perform due to visa restrictions.

In 1972 Shearston returned to England and re-recorded tracks for an album, Dingo. The single which attracted most attention was his deadpan interpretation of Cole Porter's "I Get a Kick out of You" (1974), which reached No. 19 on the Kent Music Report and No. 7 on the UK Singles Chart. Shearston returned to Australia in 1989 and later became a cleric in the Anglican Church of Australia in rural New South Wales. In 1990 he received the Tamworth Songwriters' Association's Bush Ballad of the Year award for his autobiographical song "Shopping on a Saturday". He was ordained a deacon in 1991 and a priest in 1992. Shearston served as an assistant in Narrandera (1991) and Deniliquin (1992-1993). He was priest-in-charge in Hay (1993-1998), rector of Bangalow (1998-2003) and a locum in Stanthorpe (2005-2006) and Coleambally-Darlington Point/Deniliquin (2006).

== Private life ==
In 1996 Shearston remarried. He was the subject of "Different Drum" segment on ABC-TV's Australian Story "Program 24" broadcast on 6 November 1996.

=== Death ===
Shearston died on 1 July 2013, aged 74 years, at Armidale Hospital, New South Wales after having a stroke at his home, "Ayrdrie", near Tenterfield earlier that day. He was survived by his wife Karen and two children.

== Discography ==
=== Albums ===
- Folk Songs & Ballads of Australia (April 1964) – CBS Records (BP-233094)
- Australian Broadside (March 1965) – CBS Records (BP-233186)
- Sings His Songs (May 1965) – CBS Records (BP-233320)
- The Springtime It Brings On The Shearing (June 1965) – CBS Records (BP-233226)
- Bolters, Bushrangers & Duffers (November 1965) – CBS Records (BP-233288)
- Songs of our Time (July 1967) – CBS Records (BP-233133)
- Abreaction (On a Bitumen Road With Soft Edges) (Festival 1967)
- Dingo (Charisma 1974) AUS #31
- The Greatest Stone On Earth and Other Two-Bob Wonders (Charisma 1975)
- Aussie Blue (Larrikin 1989)
- Only Love Survives (Rouseabout 2001)
- Here & There, Now & Then Anthology 1964-2001 (Rouseabout 2007)
- Best of all Trades (Rouseabout 2009)
- Renegade (Rouseabout 2011)
- The Great Australian Groove (Rouseabout 2012)
- Reverently (Restless Music 2013)
- Hills of Assisi (Restless Music 2013)
- Pathways of a Celtic Land (Restless Music 2013)

=== Extended plays ===
- The Man from Snowy River (1963) – Leedon Records (LX 10685)
- Australian Folk Songs (April 1964) – CBS Records (BG-225051)
- Songs of Our Time (June 1964) – CBS Records
- Australian Broadside (March 1965) – CBS Records (BG-225075)

=== Singles ===
Year	Single	Chart Positions	
Year	Single	AUS	UK
1963	"The Ballad of Thunderbolt"	-	-
1964	"Who Can Say?"	-	-
1964	"We Want Freedom"	-	-
1965	"Sydney Town"	33	-
1965	"Sometime Lovin'"	59	-
1974	"I Get a Kick Out of You"	19	7
1974	"Without a Song"	-	-
1975	"A Whiter Shade of Pale"	-	-

== Awards ==
=== Tamworth Songwriters Awards ===
The Tamworth Songwriters Association (TSA) is an annual songwriting contest for original country songs, awarded at the Tamworth Country Music Festival. They commenced in 1986.

Year	Nominee / work	Award	Result (wins only)
1990	"Shopping on a Saturday" by Gary Shearston	Traditional Bush Ballad of the Year	Won

== See also ==
- List of Old Newingtonians
- List of performers on Top of the Pops
