= Jamaica (musical) =

- Original Cast Recording
- Music: Harold Arlen
- Lyrics: E.Y. Harburg
- Book: E.Y. Harburg; Fred Saidy
- Productions: 1957 Broadway

Jamaica is a musical with a book by Yip Harburg and Fred Saidy, lyrics by Harburg, and music by Harold Arlen. It is set on a small island off the coast of Jamaica, and tells about a simple island community fighting to avoid being overrun by American commercialism.

Arlen's music parodies the popular form of Calypso, which was in vogue in the 1950s, largely as a result of the popularity of Harry Belafonte, for whom the musical originally was written. Belafonte withdrew from the production due to illness, and the musical was tailored around the talents of Lena Horne. Harburg was blacklisted in Hollywood at the time of the writing of the musical, and the satire is unusually pointed. Many of the topics raised in the songs, including evolution, nuclear energy, and consumerism, remain topical today.

== Productions ==
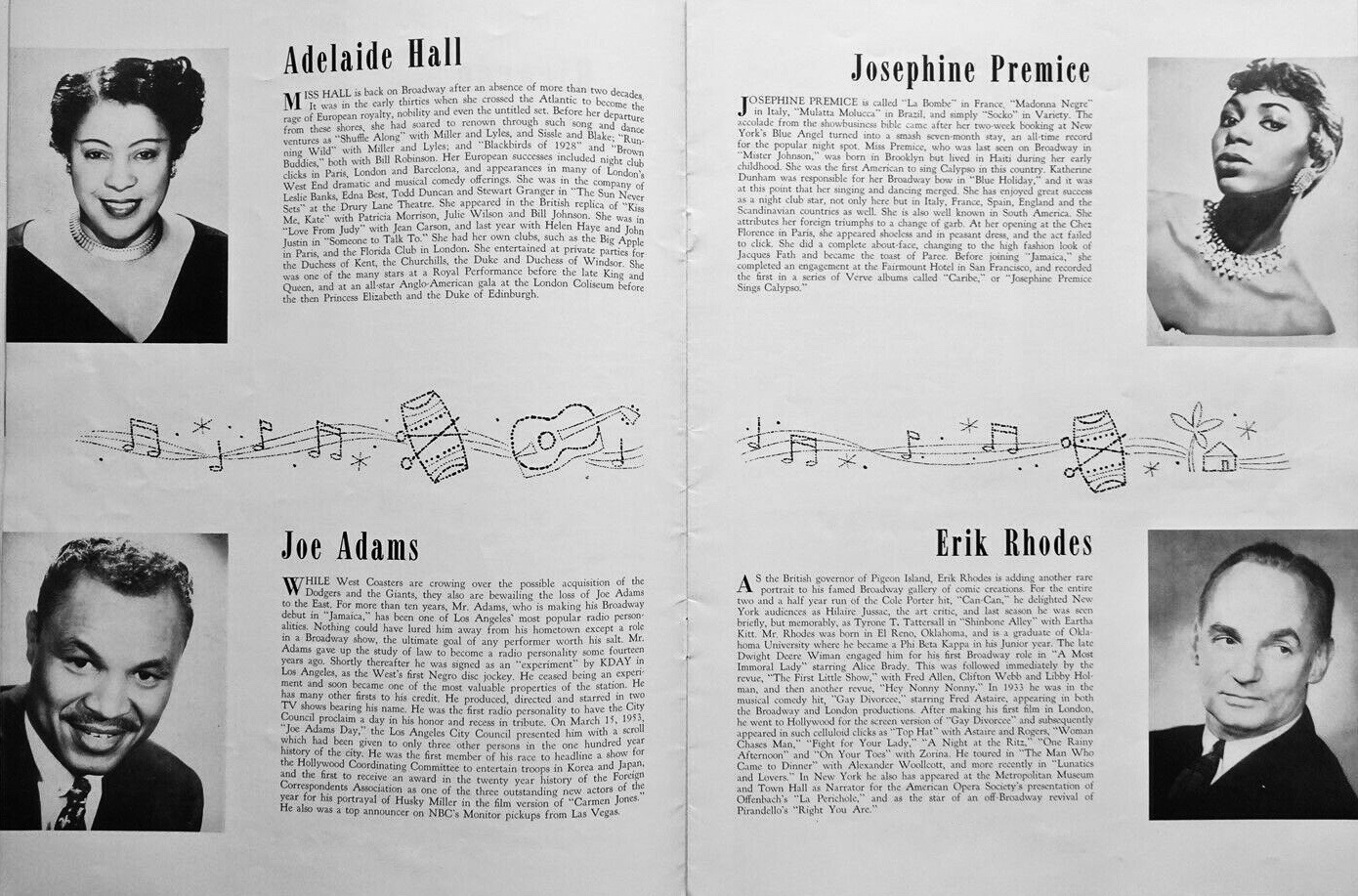
Adelaide Hall, Josephine Premice, Joe Adams, and Erik Rhodes bios in the Jamaica souvenir program

The musical opened in Philadelphia. Later, it moved to Broadway, opening at the Imperial Theatre on October 31, 1957 and closed on April 11, 1959 after 558 performances. The musical was directed by Robert Lewis and produced by David Merrick, with choreography by Jack Cole, scenic Design by Oliver Smith, costume design by Miles White and lighting design by Jean Rosenthal. The cast included Ricardo Montalbán as Koli and Lena Horne as Savannah, with Ossie Davis as Cicero, Erik Rhodes as Governor, Adelaide Hall as Grandma Obeah, and Josephine Premice as Ginger. Alvin Ailey and Nat Horne were principal dancers.

The song "Boy, Girl, and Island" was originally written for the play, but was cut and replaced by "Take It Slow, Joe."

An original cast recording was released by RCA Victor.

== Synopsis ==
Savannah, a beautiful island girl, longs to escape to New York City to live a life of modern conveniences. She is tempted to accept the marriage proposal of a New York businessman visiting the island. However, when Koli, an impoverished fisherman, saves her younger brother's life during a hurricane, she opts to remain with him.

== Cast of characters (in order of appearance) ==
- Koli
- Quico
- Savannah
- Grandma Obeah
- Ginger
- Snodgrass
- Hucklebuck
- Island Women
- The Governor
- Cicero
- Lancaster
- First Ship's Officer
- Second Ship's Officer
- Joe Nashua
- Dock Worker
- Radio Announcer

== Song list ==
Act I

- Savannah
- Savannah's Wedding Day
- Pretty to Walk With
- Push the Button
- Incompatibility
- Little Biscuit
- Cocoanut Sweet
- Pity the Sunset
- Yankee Dollar
- What Good Does It Do?
- Monkey in the Mango Tree
- Take It Slow, Joe
- Ain't It the Truth

Act II

- Leave the Atom Alone
- Cocoanut Sweet (Reprise)
- For Every Fish
- I Don't Think I'll End It All Today
- Napoleon Is a Pastry
- Ain't It the Truth (Reprise)
- Savannah (Reprise)

== Awards and nominations ==
=== Original Broadway production ===
Year	Award	Category	Nominee	Result
1958	Tony Award	Best Musical		Nominated
1958	Tony Award	Best Performance by a Leading Actor in a Musical	Ricardo Montalbán	Nominated
1958	Tony Award	Best Performance by a Leading Actress in a Musical	Lena Horne	Nominated
1958	Tony Award	Best Performance by a Featured Actor in a Musical	Ossie Davis	Nominated
1958	Tony Award	Best Performance by a Featured Actress in a Musical	Josephine Premice	Nominated
1958	Tony Award	Best Scenic Design	Oliver Smith	Nominated
1958	Tony Award	Best Costume Design	Miles White	Nominated
