= Dania Krupska =

American actress

Dania Krupska (August 13, 1921 – August 27, 2011) was an American dancer and choreographer.

Krupska was born in Fall River, Massachusetts in 1921 to Polish immigrants, Bronisław and Anna Krupska. Anna, a concert pianist who had studied ballet but never made it as a ballerina pushed her daughter to train as a dancer. Dania studied ballet and began her professional career in the 1930s in such companies as the Philadelphia Ballet.

She made her Broadway debut in the original cast of Agnes de Mille's Oklahoma! (1943), later taking over the role of Dream Laurey (which she also performed on tour). She quickly became one of de Mille's regular assistant choreographers, working on Allegro (1947), Gentlemen Prefer Blondes (1949), Out of This World (1950), and The Girl in Pink Tights (1954). Krupska also assisted de Mille on the ballet Fall River Legend (1948); de Mille's insistence that Krupska be allowed to dance one performance as Lizzie Borden led to an explosive quarrel with Alicia Alonso, unbeknownst to Krupska herself.

Before switching to choreography full-time, Krupska also appeared on Broadway in The King and I and the original Can-Can (1953).

Krupska's best-known work as a choreographer is The Most Happy Fella (1956), for which she received her first Tony nomination. (She also staged the 1959 revival.) None of her other Broadway shows were hits, although she earned another Tony nomination for The Happiest Girl in the World (1961). Krupska also choreographed Shoestring Revue (1955), off-Broadway shows, and the jazz ballet Points on Jazz (staged by American Ballet Theatre in 1961). She also staged the 1962 production of Fiorello!.

== Personal life ==
Krupska was married to musical theatre actor Ted Thurston. She died in 2011 at the age of 90 in East Hampton, New York.

== See also ==
- Agnes de Mille
