= The Happiest Girl in the World =

- Original Recording
- Music: Jacques Offenbach
- Lyrics: E.Y. Harburg
- Book: Fred Saidy; Henry Mayers
- Basis: Comedy Lysistrata by Aristophanes
- Productions: 1961 Broadway

The Happiest Girl in the World is a musical with a book by Fred Saidy and Henry Mayers, lyrics by E.Y. Harburg, and music taken from the works of Jacques Offenbach.

Based on the comedy Lysistrata by Aristophanes and tales of Greek mythology by Thomas Bulfinch, it focuses on the women of ancient Greece and Sparta who, inspired by virginal goddess Diana, vow to withhold sex from their husbands and lovers until they promise to put an end to their fighting. Complications ensue when Diana's uncle and underworld ruler Pluto balks at the notion of peace and attempts to derail her plan.

The Broadway production, directed by Cyril Ritchard and choreographed by Dania Krupska, opened on April 3, 1961, at the Martin Beck Theatre, where it ran for 98 performances. The cast included Ritchard in multiple roles (most notably that of Pluto), Janice Rule as Diana, and Lainie Kazan, David Canary, Ted Thurston, and Bruce Yarnell in supporting roles.

Krupska was nominated for the Tony Award for Best Choreography and Yarnell won the Theatre World Award for his performance.

An original cast recording was released by Columbia Records.

== Musical numbers ==
Source:Guide to Musical Theatre

Act I

- Cheers for the Hero
- The Glory That is Greece
- The Happiest Girl in the World
- The Greek Marine
- Shall We Say Farewell
- Never Be-Devil the Devil
- Whatever They May Be
- Eureka
- The Oath
- The Happiest Girl in the World (Reprise)
- Diana's Transformation
- Vive La Virtue!
- Adrift on a Star
- The Happiest Girl in the World (Reprise)
- Act One Finale

Act II

- That'll Be the Day
- How Soon, Oh Moon?
- Love-Sick Serenade
- Five Minutes of Spring
- The Greek Marine (Reprise)
- Five Minutes of Spring (Reprise)
- Never Trust a Virgin
- Entrance of the Courtesans
- The Pied Piper's Can-Can
- Vive La Virtue! (Reprise)
- Finale
