= The Peter, Paul and Mary Album =

Studio album by Peter, Paul and Mary
- Released: 1966
- Genre: Folk, pop
- Length: 35:09
- Label: Warner Bros.
- Producer: Albert Grossman; Milton Okun (musical director)

Peter, Paul and Mary chronology
See What Tomorrow Brings (1965)	The Peter, Paul and Mary Album (1966)	Album 1700 (1967)

Professional ratings
Review scores
Source	Rating
Allmusic	3/5 stars

The Peter, Paul and Mary Album, also known as Album, is the sixth studio album by the American folk music trio Peter, Paul and Mary, released in 1966 (see 1966 in music).

The album included session contributions from several in-demand musicians of the era, including Mike Bloomfield, Al Kooper and Charlie McCoy. Notable songs include "Hurry Sundown", which was released as a single, and "Norman Normal," which provided the basis of a 1968 Warner Bros. Cartoon Special of the same name, co-credited to Noel Stookey.

== Track listing ==
1. "And When I Die" (Laura Nyro) – 2:45
2. "Sometime Lovin'" (Gary Shearston) – 3:05
3. "Pack up Your Sorrows" (Richard Fariña, Pauline Marden) – 3:04
4. "The King of Names" (Peter Yarrow) – 4:05
5. "For Baby (For Bobbie)" (John Denver) – 2:45
6. "Hurry Sundown" (Yip Harburg, Earl Robinson) – 2:55
7. "The Other Side of This Life" (Fred Neil) – 3:01
8. "The Good Times We Had" (Paul Stookey) – 2:35
9. "Kisses Sweeter Than Wine" (Paul Campbell, Joel Newman, Pete Seeger, Lee Hays) – 3:05
10. "Norman Normal" (Stookey) – 2:15
11. "Mon Vrai Destin" (Stookey, Mary Travers, Yarrow) – 2:19
12. "Well, Well, Well" (Bob Gibson, Bob Camp) – 3:15

== Personnel ==
- Peter Yarrow – vocals, guitar
- Noel "Paul" Stookey – vocals, guitar
- Mary Travers – vocals

with:

- Michael Bloomfield – guitar on "The King of Names"
- Paul Butterfield – harmonica on "The King of Names"
- Kenny Buttrey – drums on "Sometime Lovin'"
- Pete Childs – Dobro on "Pack Up Your Sorrows"
- Bobby Gregg – drums on "The Other Side of This Life"
- Ernie Hayes – piano on "The Other Side of This Life"
- Dick Kniss – bass on "Mon Vrai Destin"
- Al Kooper – organ on "Well, Well, Well"
- Bill Lee – bass on all tracks except 5, 10, 11
- Charlie McCoy – harmonica on "Sometime Lovin'"
- Wayne Moss – guitar on "Sometime Lovin'"
- Mark Naftalin – organ on "The King of Names"
- Walter Raim – guitar on "Kisses Sweeter Than Wine"
- Hargus "Pig" Robbins – piano on "Sometime Lovin'"
- Buddy Saltzman – drums on "The King of Names"
- Russ Savakus – bass on "For Baby (For Bobbie)"
- Melvin Tax – bass flute on "The Good Times We Had"
- Irving Horowitz – English horn on "The Good Times We Had"
- Charles H. DeAngelis – bass clarinet, alto flute on "The Good Times We Had"

Technical

- Brooks Arthur – engineer
- Barry Feinstein – photography

== Chart positions ==
Year	Chart	Position
1966	Billboard Pop Albums	22
