= Mark Bramble =

American dramatist

Mark Bramble (December 7, 1950 – February 20, 2019) was an American theatre director, author, and producer. He was nominated for a Tony Award three times, for the Tony Award for Best Book of a Musical for Barnum and 42nd Street (1981) and Tony Award for Best Direction of a Musical, 42nd Street (2001).

== Early life ==
Bramble was born in Chestertown, Maryland. He attended the McDonogh School, Emerson College and New York University.

== Career ==
Bramble was involved in the writing, directing and producing of stage musicals all over the world. He began his theatrical career working as an apprentice in David Merrick's office in 1971, and for whom he worked on many Broadway productions. As author, his work included the 1980 musical Barnum, which introduced Glenn Close as a musical theatre actress, with songs by Cy Coleman and Michael Stewart. He wrote the book for The Three Musketeers (1984) with music of Rudolph Friml.

He directed and was co-librettist for the 2001 revival of 42nd Street with songs by Harry Warren and Al Dubin, and was the co-author of the book for the original 42nd Street in 1980, which was produced by David Merrick. He directed many productions of 42nd Street, in London, Sydney, Shanghai, Tokyo, Amsterdam and Vienna. His most recent London production of the show was filmed for Broadway HD, and later broadcast on PBS in November 2019.

He collaborated with Michael Stewart on many shows, including The Grand Tour (1978) with songs by Jerry Herman, Pieces of Eight, a musical adaptation of Treasure Island with songs by Jule Styne, and the off Broadway opera Elizabeth & Essex based on Maxwell Anderson’s Elizabeth The Queen, and was an assistant on the 1974 musical Mack and Mabel.

Bramble wrote the libretto and directed, with music by Henry Krieger, for the musical Fat Pig, which premiered at the Haymarket Theatre, in Leicester, England, in November 1987. The musical is a rock and roll extravaganza about health, based on the Colin McNaughton book about farmyard life and dangers. He adapted and staged Notre Dame (1991) at The Lillian Bayliss Theatre at Saddler's Wells, London.

Bramble was a member of the Dramatist's Guild, the Society of Stage Directors and Choreographers and the Association of Theatrical Press Agents and Managers.

His charitable work in his hometown of Chestertown, Maryland throughout his later years resulted in the presentation of two evenings of "Broadway Showstoppers", featuring local talent and children from the Radcliffe summer program, collaborating with longtime friend Paul Masse, music director, to develop the concerts. He was passionate about the next generation of children knowing that they could find solace from the difficulties of life through the collaboration of musical theater.

In 2017, he published a book entitled "A Tea Caddy Collection", which displayed his vast collection of antique tea caddies in catalog form, with history and narration chapters to accompany. The location and subsequent ownership of this collection upon his death are still uncertain.

== Death ==
Bramble died unexpectedly at age 68 at his home in Maryland on February 20, 2019.

== Awards and nominations ==
Bramble has received the following nominations for awards:

- 1980 Tony Award Best Book of a Musical Barnum (nominee)
- 1981 Tony Award Best Book of a Musical 42nd Street (nominee)
- 2001 Tony Award Best Direction of a Musical 42nd Street (revival) (nominee)
