= Terri White =

American actress

Terri White is an American actress and singer.

The daughter of traveling musicians Bill White and Gertrude Hughes, White has appeared in Nunsense 2: The Sequel (1994), Ain't Misbehavin' (1978), Barnum (1980), Welcome to the Club (1989), and Bubbling Brown Sugar.

In 1987 White appeared at Denver's Elitch Theatre in Nunsense with Mary Jo Catlett.

During a period of homelessness in 2008, White was recognized by NYPD Officer David Taylor in Manhattan's Greenwich Village 6th Precinct, who helped her find a place to live. Shortly thereafter, White was cast in the 2009 City Center Encores! and Broadway revival of Finian's Rainbow. She received the nomination for 2010 Drama Desk Award Outstanding Featured Actress in a Musical for Finian's Rainbow. She later assumed the role of Mama Morton in the long-running Broadway revival of Chicago in April 2010.

White appeared in the Kennedy Center production of the Stephen Sondheim-James Goldman musical Follies as Stella Deems, from May 2011 until the musical closed in June 2011. This production moved to Broadway's Marquis Theatre where previews began August 7, 2011. The official opening was September 12, 2011. It closed four months later.

White has performed her solo cabaret act in several venues. Prior to its closing in 2007, she regularly performed at Rose's Turn in Manhattan's West Village, where she was employed as a bartender. She has performed at Sardi's Restaurant, also in New York City. She performed at the Arthur Newman Theater in Palm Desert, California in 2013.

In October 2015, after performing her cabaret act at the Kennedy Center, White announced that she was retiring from live performing, due to health and other issues.

== Personal life ==
White and Donna Barnett were married in a same-sex marriage ceremony at the St. James Theatre on July 25, 2011.
