= Hurry Sundown (Peter, Paul and Mary song) =

"Hurry Sundown" is a 1966 song written by Yip Harburg and Earl Robinson, and first recorded by the folk music trio Peter, Paul and Mary.

The song was commissioned by the director Otto Preminger, who wanted a theme song for his 1967 film Hurry Sundown. Preminger contacted Robinson, who began working on the song, then visited Harburg for help with the lyrics. Harburg was not interested in the financial contract, but nonetheless assisted with shaping the song.

Preminger chose not to use the song. However, Milt Okun, who was at that point the arranger for Peter, Paul and Mary, heard "Hurry Sundown" and suggested it to the group. They recorded the song and released it on their 1966 album, The Peter, Paul and Mary Album. The song was the second single released from the album, after "The Other Side of This Life". It was released on January 14, 1967, and reached #37 on the Billboard Easy Listening chart, as well as #123 on the Bubbling Under Hot 100 Singles chart. A group of musicians whose names have never been identified provided the brass section for this song. The single version omits the brass section, as well as the third verse, in which the time length runs 2:10.

Cash Box said the single was a "solidly building ballad [that] tells a moving tale of the growth of a man or perhaps all men."

"Hurry Sundown" was one of eight songs nominated for the Best Folk Recording Grammy Award in 1967; the song lost to Cortelia Clark's "Blues in the Street".

Note: Little Richard recorded a different song of the same title, as the B-side of his 1967 single "I Don't Want to Discuss It." but that is not the same song. Hugo Montenegro and The Outlaws also have similarly titled songs.

== Covers ==
"Hurry Sundown" was also recorded by the Free Design for their 1969 album Heaven/Earth.

== See also ==
- Hurry On Sundown
