= How Are Things in Glocca Morra? =

Song about a fictional Irish village

"How Are Things in Glocca Morra?" is a popular song about a fictional village in Ireland, with themes of nostalgia and homesickness. It was introduced by Ella Logan in the original 1947 Broadway production of Finian's Rainbow.

== Production ==
The music was composed by Burton Lane and the lyrics were written by E.Y. Harburg. The song was published in 1946 and introduced in the 1947 musical Finian's Rainbow. There is no actual Glocca Morra in Ireland. In a television interview late in his life, Harburg revealed that the name "Glocca Morra" was made up by composer Lane, who had devised a dummy lyric beginning with the line, "There's a glen in Glocca Morra". Harburg liked the name but insisted on changing the line to "How are things in Glocca Morra?" because this is personal and immediately evocative of nostalgia and homesickness.

James Stephens' work The Crock of Gold (first published in 1912) refers to "the leprechauns of Gort na Cloca Mora" (an approximation of gort na clocha móra, "field of the big rocks" in Irish). It is unknown whether Lane or Harburg were aware of the novel or whether this is a coincidence.

== Other versions ==
Many versions of this song were recorded in 1946 and 1947, including a version by Dick Haymes, recorded on December 29, 1946, and released by Decca Records as catalog number 23830. The record reached the Billboard chart on March 29, 1947, peaking at number 9, and spent five weeks on the chart.

Other early versions included the Buddy Clark version, recorded on October 14, 1946, and released by Columbia Records as catalog number 37223. It spent eight weeks on the chart, peaking at number 6; the Ella Logan/Albert Sharpe version, recorded on April 3, 1947, and released by Columbia Records as catalog number MM 686 (the original cast album of the Broadway production); the Stuart Foster/Tommy Dorsey version, recorded on December 30, 1946, and released by RCA Victor Records as catalog number 20-2122; the Martha Tilton version, recorded on November 25, 1946, and released by Capitol Records as catalog number 345; and the Harry Babbitt version recorded on January 20, 1947, and released by Mercury Records as catalog number 3056. In addition, legendary jazz saxophonist Sonny Rollins recorded this tune for his Blue Note Records debut, Sonny Rollins, Volume One.

In the publication Cash Box, which combined sales of all artists into a single position. the song reached number 4.

The song, performed by Petula Clark, is also part of the soundtrack of the 1968 film version of the stage musical. She has included the number in her concert repertoire.

Numerous others have recorded the song, including Bing Crosby in 1975 for his album At My Time of Life, Barbra Streisand, and Julie Andrews. In 1969, it was recorded by the Scottish singer, Moira Anderson.

Gracie Fields first recorded this in 1947 and re-recorded it in 1956 and 1970. This song was regularly performed in her cabaret acts and live performances, often with a trademark headscarf. She also performed this during her two-week run at The Batley Variety Club in 1965.

Jazz guitarist Gene Bertoncini recorded a solo guitar arrangement of this song on his 1999 release, Body and Soul.

The Irish Tenors recorded "How Are Things In Glocca Morra" for their album Ellis Island at Registration Hall on Ellis Island.

== Impact ==
Between 1948 and 1954, an Irish variety troupe organised by Pete Davis and featuring Cecil Sheridan toured Scottish theatres as "the Gossoons from Glocca-Morra".

The song was a particular favorite of President John F. Kennedy, as was Finian's Rainbow.

The song was transposed by Scotland the What? about their fictional Aberdeenshire village Auchterturra in "How Are Things in Auchterturra?"

In the movie Party Monster, Seth Green's character, James Saint James, makes a reference to the perfect sentence: "Last night, I dreamt of Glocca Morra...again." (The reference parodies: "Last night I dreamt I went to Manderley again", the famous first line of Daphne du Maurier's Rebecca.)

The song is referenced in the Sports Night episode "Celebrities" (Season 2, Episode 15) and the song title is directly used as the title of an episode from Season 1 (Episode 17).

When Goody Rickles (Don Rickles' sillier look-alike) comically mangles the name of the deadly compound "Pyrogranulate" in the comic book Jimmy Olsen 139, by Jack Kirby, what comes out is "Pyro-Glocca-Morra".

In an episode of All in the Family, Archie Bunker refers to New York City as a "regular Sodom and Glocca Morra."

In "A Shift in the Night" (S02E18), an episode of ER, Dr. Mark Greene asks a colleague "How are things in Glocca Morra?"

The song was referenced by Daffy Duck in the 1948 cartoon Daffy Dilly.

The title was parodied on comedians Abbott and Costello's radio show, as "How are things in Glocca, moron?"

In Mad Men: "For Immediate Release", Roger Sterling asks his flight attendant girlfriend, Daisy, "How are things in Gloccamora?"

The fictional town in the song's title was taken for the name of the band Glocca Morra.

Several pubs around the world have been called Glocca Morra, including one in New York, one in Milwaukee and one in Caherdrina outside Mitchelstown.
