= Fred Saidy =

American dramatist

Fred Saidy

Fred Saidy (February 11, 1907 – May 14, 1982) was an American playwright and screenwriter.

== Early life and education ==
Fareed "Fred" Milhelm Saidy was born in Los Angeles, California on February 11, 1907. He graduated from New York University with a degree in journalism, and while a student there wrote for the NYU Daily News. He formed closed friendships with other writers working at that student paper; including future playwright and screenwriter Jerry Horwin (1905–1954), lyricist Paul Francis Webster, and lawyer David Garrison Berger. In 1927 Saidy quit the school paper in protest after the paper refused to publish an editorial he wrote that criticized NYU's faculty over the dismissal of Estelle Hertz who was forced out of her position as president of NYU's League of Women. His decision to quit was the subject on an article in The New York Times.

== Career ==
Saidy initially worked as a journalist before transitioning into a career as a playwright; initially breaking into the news business as a writer of poetry for Franklin P. Adams's column. In the 1930s he contributed work to the New York Herald Tribune and Oakland Tribune. By 1937 he was working as a scriptwriter on staff at Republic Pictures. Much of his early work in film died in development; including a planned biographical film of composer Pyotr Ilyich Tchaikovsky which he co-authored with Gilbert Gabriel (1890–1952). While working for Republic his son was born on May 16, 1937.

In 1942 Saidy co-authored the sketches to the musical revue Rally ’ Round the Flag with Arthur A. Ross; a work staged at the Assistance League Theatre in Los Angeles which was directed by Carlos Romero and included songs by Paul Francis Webster, Walter Jurmann, Billy Rose, and Earl Carroll among others. He penned sketches used in the film Star Spangled Rhythm (1942), and wrote the screenplay for the Red Skelton comedy I Dood It (1943). He followed this by writing the script for the Lucille Ball-Dick Powell feature film Meet the People (1944).

Saidy's first significant contribution to a stage musical was the book for the Harold Arlen and E. Y. Harburg's Bloomer Girl; the latter having a major success on Broadway where it ran for 653 performances from 1944 to 1946. Starring Celeste Holm, the work was set during the American Civil War and told the story of a rebellious young woman who harbors an escaped slave on her journey on the Underground Railroad. It was later adapted into a television film starring Barbara Cook. It was the first of several collaborations with Harburg, which included Finian's Rainbow (1947), Flahooley (1951), Jamaica (1957), and The Happiest Girl in the World (1961). Flahooley and The Happiest Girl in the World were both failures, but Finian's Rainbow and Jamaica were both hits in their original productions. Jamaica was nominated for the Tony Award for Best Musical, and was a starring vehicle for Lena Horne.

Finian's Rainbow is Saidy's most enduring work with recent revivals including a Broadway production in 2009 and a London production in 2014. During his lifetime it had three major Broadway revivals (1955, 1960, and 1967), and was also made into a film starring Fred Astaire and Petula Clark, directed by Francis Ford Coppola, in 1968. This film was Saidy's last project, and he was nominated for the Writers Guild of America Award for Best Written American Musical. He had earlier collaborated with Neil Simon and Will Glickman, among others, on Satins and Spurs, an original television musical for Betty Hutton, which was broadcast by NBC in September 1954.

Saidy died after a long illness on May 14, 1982. He was the father of the international chess master Anthony Saidy.
