= Barnum (musical) =

1980 musical

- Music: Cy Coleman
- Lyrics: Michael Stewart
- Book: Mark Bramble
- Basis: The life of P. T. Barnum
- Premiere: April 30, 1980: St. James Theatre, New York City
- Productions: 1980 Broadway; 1981 West End; 1984 Madrid; 1984 UK Tour; 2013 Chichester; 2014 UK Tour; 2017 Off-West End; 2024 Newbury; 2026 UK Tour

Barnum is an American musical with a book by Mark Bramble, lyrics by Michael Stewart, and music by Cy Coleman. It is based on the life of showman P. T. Barnum, covering the period from 1835 through 1880 in America and major cities of the world where Barnum took his performing companies. The production combines elements of traditional musical theater with the spectacle of the circus. The characters include jugglers, trapeze artists and clowns, as well as such real-life personalities as Jenny Lind and General Tom Thumb.

The original Broadway production ran for 854 performances and was followed by a London production, among others.

== Synopsis ==
In the middle of the 19th century, Phineas Taylor (P.T.) Barnum introduces his circus acts as he stands in front of a tent, proclaiming ("There Is a Sucker Born Ev'ry Minute"). He loves spectacle and excitement, using hype and "humbug" to promote his exhibits. His wife Charity disagrees with his use of "humbug" but loves him and aims to keep him grounded. Barnum then introduces the oldest woman alive, Joice Heth, and thanks to some Barnum humbug she becomes a success ("Thank God I'm Old"). His wife Charity ("Chairy") urges him to get a job in a factory, but Barnum refuses ("The Colors of My Life [Part One]") and Charity wryly admits and accepts the disparity between their views ("The Colors of My Life [Part Two]"). Barnum enlists clowns to help in building a museum to house his attractions (with expected comical results) and it's up to Charity to encourage him to keep going ("One Brick at a Time"), with the result that "everything about [his] museum was spectacular" ("Museum Song"); however, the museum burns down accidentally. Barnum finds two new star attractions, Tom Thumb, who appears to advise that "Bigger Isn't Better", and Jumbo the elephant. Barnum then becomes manager of the famous Swedish opera singer Jenny Lind ("Love Makes Such Fools of Us All"). Barnum becomes enamored of her and sees the attraction of going on tour with her ("Out There"). He accompanies Jenny on tour, leaving Charity behind, as a marching band greets them ("Come Follow the Band"). Although all seems to be going well for Barnum, he finds that without Charity in his life he is miserable, and he decides to break ties with Jenny and return home to the woman he loves ("Love Makes Such Fools of Us All [Reprise]"). Upon his return to Charity, he promises to live the more sedate life she desires for him, in "Black and White." After a failed stint running a clockworks factory and a failed attempt to build his own city, he turns to politics; when his campaign looks doomed to fail due to lack of interest, Charity realizes how important his talents and passion are in his life and allows him to inject color and life into his campaign. He is elected Mayor of Bridgeport, and the two of them recognize the value in each other's approach to life and how they complement one another ("The Colors of My Life [Reprise]"). Barnum is prepared to run for Senator, but his beloved Charity dies suddenly, leaving Barnum bereft and alone. When Barnum finds himself cheated of the Senatorial nomination by his political party, he laments his position, realizes that his talent for Humbug will never leave him and wishes to "make it right, shoot a rocket, shine a light" ("Prince of Humbug"). James Anthony Bailey arrives and offers him the chance to "Join the Circus". Initially resisting, he relents (thanks in part to Charity's two-headed coin, which she has used to humbug him throughout the show) and joins Bailey, and they form the famous circus Barnum and Bailey.

In "a princely final attraction", Barnum appears before the audience ("The Final Event: There is a Sucker Born Ev'ry Minute" [Reprise]") and reflects on his past:

Of course, that was a long time ago...and Joice Heth is gone and forgotten. And so's the American Museum...and the Living Whale...and Jennie Lind...and my poor Tom Thumb. And them reubens that came over on the Mayflower have gone to dust...and Tom Jefferson's a memory...and old Franklin's flown his last kite. So my kind of Humbug's disappeared. Pity.

== Musical numbers ==
Act I

- "Overture Chase"
- "There is a Sucker Born Ev'ry Minute" – Barnum
- "Humble Beginnings Chase"
- "Thank God I'm Old" – Joice Heth and Tambourine Players
- "The Colors of My Life" (Part 1) – Barnum
- "The Colors of My Life" (Part 2) – Charity
- "One Brick at a Time" – Charity, Barnum and Bricklayers
- "Museum Song" – Barnum
- "Female of the Species Chase"
- "I Like Your Style" – Barnum and Charity
- "Bigger Isn't Better" – Tom Thumb
- "Love Makes Such Fools of Us All" – Jenny Lind
- "Midway Chase"
- "Out There" – Barnum and Charity

Act II

- "Come Follow the Band" – Potomac Marching Band and Washingtonians
- "Black and White" – Charity, Choir, Blues Singer, Barnum and Citizens of Bridgeport
- "The Colors of My Life" (Reprise) – Barnum and Charity
- "The Prince of Humbug" – Barnum
- "Join the Circus" – Bailey, Circus Performers and Barnum
- "Finale Chase"
- "The Final Event: There is a Sucker Born Ev'ry Minute" (Reprise)

The following list was used for the Chichester and UK tour productions, although many of the chases were still used:

Act One

- There is a Sucker Born Ev'ry Minute - Barnum
- Thank God I'm Old - Joice Heth
- The Colors of My Life - Charity and Barnum
- One Brick at a Time - Charity and Ensemble
- Museum Song - Barnum
- I Like Your Style - Chairy and Barnum
- Bigger isn't Better - Tom Thumb and Ensemble
- Love Makes Such Fools of Us All - Jenny Lind
- Out There - Barnum

Act Two

- Come Follow The Band - Barnum and Ensemble
- Love Makes Such Fools of Us All (Reprise) - Jenny Lind
- Black and White - Charity, Barnum and Ensemble
- I Like Your Style - The Colours of My Life (Reprise) - Charity and Barnum
- Barnum's Lament - Barnum
- Join the Circus - Barnum, Bailey and Ensemble
- Finale - Barnum

== Cast ==
Character	Broadway	London	Chichester	UK tour	London revival
Character	1980	1981	2013	2014	2017
Phineas Taylor Barnum	Jim Dale	Michael Crawford	Christopher Fitzgerald	Brian Conley	Marcus Brigstocke
Charity (Chairy) Barnum	Glenn Close	Deborah Grant	Tamsin Carroll	Linzi Hateley	Laura Pitt-Pulford
Ringmaster	William C. Witter	William C. Witter	James O’Connell	John Stacey	Dominic Owen
Joice Heith	Terri White	Jennie McGustie	Aretha Ayeh	Landi Oshinowo	Tupele Dorgu
Jenny Lind	Marianne Tatum	Sarah Payne	Anna O’Byrne	Kimberly Blake	Celinde Schoenmaker
General Tom Thumb	Leonard John Crofoot	Christopher Beck	Jack North	Mikey Jay-Heath	Harry Francis
Amos Scudder	Kelly Walters	Grant Smith	Max Parker	Edward Wade	Danny Collins
James Bailey	William C. Witter	William C. Witter	James O’Connell	John Stacey	Dominic Owen
Chester Lyman	Terrence Mann	Tony Kemp	Rachael Archer	Nick Butcher	Lucie-Mae Summer
Mr. Stratton	Dirk Lumbard	Tony Kemp	Nick Butcher	Nick Butcher	Ainsley Hall Ricketts
Mrs. Stratton	Sophie Schwab	Christine Cartwright	Trina Hill	Lucy Thatcher	—N/a

== Production history ==
=== Original Broadway production (1980–1982) ===
The original production opened at the St. James Theatre on Broadway, on April 30, 1980, and closed on May 16, 1982, after 854 performances and 26 previews. It was directed and choreographed by Joe Layton, with scenic design by David Mitchell, costume design by Theoni V. Aldredge, and lighting design by Craig Miller. The musical starred Jim Dale as P.T. Barnum, Glenn Close as Charity Barnum, Marianne Tatum as Jenny Lind, Terri White as Joice Heth, and Terrence Mann as Chester Lyman (he also understudied Dale as Barnum). During Jim Dale's vacation in May 1981, the part of Barnum was played by Tony Orlando, and when Dale left the production in October 1981, Mike Burstyn assumed the role for the remainder of the show's run.

=== Original West End production and UK tours (1981–1986) ===
The show made its West End debut on June 11, 1981, at the London Palladium, where it ran for 655 performances. The London cast included Michael Crawford as P.T. Barnum, Deborah Grant as Charity Barnum and Sarah Payne as Jenny Lind. Crawford reprised his role opposite Eileen Battye in a UK Tour of the show which ran between 1984 and 1986, stopping off at various venues including the Manchester Opera House and a West End revival at the Victoria Palace Theatre. The tour was recorded for television and broadcast by the BBC in 1986. It was later released on VHS and DVD.

There was a further revival in London at the Dominion Theatre, starring Paul Nicholas and another in a circus tent in Battersea Park (where circuses run by David Smart had previously been held) starring Blue Peter presenter Peter Duncan. Another UK tour ran from 1995 to 1996 starring Andrew O'Connor in the title role.

=== Chichester revival (2013) and UK tour (2014–15) ===
Two-time Tony Award-nominee Christopher Fitzgerald starred in Cameron Mackintosh's new production of the show at the Chichester Festival Theatre from 15 July to 31 August 2013. The show was not performed at the Festival Theatre due to its refurbishment. Instead, it was performed in the Theatre in the Park, which is near the Festival Theatre. It was directed by Timothy Sheader, co-directed and choreographed by Liam Steel and co-choreographed by Andrew Wright, set design by Scott Pask, costume design by Paul Wills, lighting design by Paule Constable, sound design by Mick Potter and circus consultancy by Vicki Amedume. Alongside Christopher Fitzgerald as P. T. Barnum was Tamsin Carroll as Charity Barnum, Anna O'Byrne as Jenny Lind, Aretha Ayeh as Joice Heth and Jack North as Tom Thumb.

The production was revised by Cameron Mackintosh and Mark Bramble with a new number, "Barnum's Lament", replacing "The Prince of Humbug", slight revisions elsewhere and new orchestrations by William David Brohn.

The national tour of Cameron Mackintosh and Chichester Festival Theatre's production opened at Curve, Leicester in September 2014 and ran until August 2015. The tour starred Brian Conley in the title role, alongside Linzi Hateley as Charity.

=== Off-West End revival (2017–18) ===
An Off West End revival opened at the Menier Chocolate Factory on 5 December 2017 (with previews from 25 November) running until 3 March 2018. The production was directed by Gordon Greenberg, with choreography by Rebecca Howell, design by Paul Farnsworth and musical direction by Alex Parker. The production starred Marcus Brigstocke in the title role, Laura Pitt-Pulford as Charity, Celinde Schoenmaker as Jenny Lind, Tupele Dorgu as Joice Heath and Harry Francis as Tom Thumb.

=== Newbury revival (2024) and UK tour (2026) ===
A new production played at the Watermill Theatre, Newbury, Berkshire from 2 July to 8 September 2024, directed by Jonathan O’Boyle and choreographed by Oti Mabuse. The cast featured Matt Rawle in the titular role, Monique Young as Charity Barnum, Penny Ashmore as Jenny Lind, Fergus Rattigan as General Tom Thumb, Tania Mathurin as Joyce Heth amongst a cast of actor-musicians in this acclaimed immersive production.

In June 2025, it was announced that the production will tour the UK from 30 January 2026, opening at Theatre Royal, Windsor, starring Lee Mead in the title role.

=== Other productions ===
Stacy Keach played Barnum in a June 1981 production at the Kennedy Center with Dee Hoty as Charity and Terri White reprising her Broadway role as Joice Heth.

Other productions were staged in France (1981) starring Jean-Luc Moreau, Australia (1982) starring Reg Livermore, Italy (1983) starring Massimo Ranieri, Madrid (1984) starring Emilio Aragón, The Netherlands (1988) starring Mike Burstyn, Florida, USA (2008) starring Brad Oscar, and Melbourne, Australia (2019) starring Todd McKenney.

== Recording ==
The Original Broadway Cast recording was released in 1980 and issued on CD in 1986. The London cast album Michael Crawford in Barnum was released on January 1, 1994, by Musicrama, Inc. The original Madrid cast album (starring Emilio Aragón) was released in 1984 by BAT Discos S.A. Now a collector's item, this Spanish language recording has never been released on CD. A French cast album (ZL 37467) starring Jean-Luc Moreau was released in 1981; it is unknown at this time if a CD version has been released.

An Australian cast recording was released starring Reg Livermore by RCA Victor.

== Response ==
According to Don Wilmeth, Barnum "was blessed with a brilliant production by director-choreographer Joe Layton, who turned the theatre into a circus, and a memorable performance by Jim Dale."

Thomas Hischak wrote: "Joe Layton directed and choreographed with inventive and colorful theatrics, and [Jim] Dale endeared himself to audiences by singing, dancing, walking a tightrope, clowning, and riding a unicycle, most of which had nothing to do with anything. Critics carped but playgoers knew a fun show when they saw one so the show ran for 854 performances."

== Awards and nominations ==
Original Production	Award	Category	Nominee	Result
Broadway; 1980	Tony Award	Best Musical		Nominated
Broadway; 1980	Tony Award	Best Book of a Musical	Mark Bramble	Nominated
Broadway; 1980	Tony Award	Best Original Score	Cy Coleman and Michael Stewart	Nominated
Broadway; 1980	Tony Award	Best Performance by a Leading Actor in a Musical	Jim Dale	Won
Broadway; 1980	Tony Award	Best Performance by a Featured Actress in a Musical	Glenn Close	Nominated
Broadway; 1980	Tony Award	Best Direction of a Musical	Joe Layton	Nominated
Broadway; 1980	Tony Award	Best Choreography	Joe Layton	Nominated
Broadway; 1980	Tony Award	Best Scenic Design	David Mitchell	Won
Broadway; 1980	Tony Award	Best Costume Design	Theoni V. Aldredge	Won
Broadway; 1980	Tony Award	Best Lighting Design	Craig Miller	Nominated
Broadway; 1980	Drama Desk Award	Outstanding Musical		Nominated
Broadway; 1980	Drama Desk Award	Outstanding Music	Cy Coleman	Nominated
Broadway; 1980	Drama Desk Award	Outstanding Actor in a Musical	Jim Dale	Won
Broadway; 1980	Drama Desk Award	Outstanding Director of a Musical	Joe Layton	Nominated
Broadway; 1980	Drama Desk Award	Outstanding Choreography	Joe Layton	Nominated
Broadway; 1980	Drama Desk Award	Outstanding Set Design	David Mitchell	Nominated
Broadway; 1980	Theatre World Award		Marianne Tatum	Won
London; 1981	Laurence Olivier Award	Best New Musical		Nominated
London; 1981	Laurence Olivier Award	Best Actor in a Musical	Michael Crawford	Won
London; 1981	Laurence Olivier Award	Outstanding Achievement in a Musical	The Staging	Nominated

== See also ==
- The Greatest Showman, a 2017 American musical film starring Hugh Jackman as a significantly more fictionalized P.T. Barnum.
- The Greatest Showman (musical), a 2026 stage musical based on the film.
