= Ted Thurston =

American actor

Ted Thurston (January 9, 1917 – July 23, 1994) was an American actor and singer.

Born in Saint Paul, Minnesota, Thurston made his Broadway debut in the short-lived 1951 musical Flahooley. He had better luck with his next show, the Lerner and Loewe musical Paint Your Wagon. Additional Broadway credits include Kismet, The Happiest Girl in the World, The Girl in Pink Tights, The Most Happy Fella, Li'l Abner, I Had a Ball, Luther, Gantry, Onward Victoria, and perhaps his best-known role, Edgar Allan Rich in Celebration.

Thurston reprised his Li'l Abner role in the film version.

Thurston was married to dancer/choreographer Dania Krupska. He died of stomach cancer in East Hampton, New York.
