= Ian Martin (actor) =

American actor and writer

- Born: April 29, 1912; Glasgow, Scotland
- Died: July 25, 1981 (aged 69); New York City, U.S.
- Education: Harvard College
- Occupations: Actor, writer
- Spouses: Inge Adams; Joan Arliss
- Children: 4

Ian Martin (April 29, 1912 – July 25, 1981) was an American actor on Broadway, radio, and television and a writer. He appeared on television more than 700 times and on radio more than 15,000 times.

== Early years ==
Born in Glasgow, Scotland, on April 29, 1912, Martin was the son of composer George Martin and English actress Violet Robertson. He acted in Scotland as a child before moving to the United States in 1928. Fieldston, the private school that he attended, had some classes taught in French and German, which helped him to pick up accents and dialects that he later used as an actor. After graduating from Harvard College, he became a radio actor, announcer, and writer.

== Career ==
Martin's early experience on stage came in acting with stock theater companies. He first appeared on Broadway in All Men Are Alike (1941). After serving in the Army and working on radio, he returned to Broadway to become the fourth actor to portray Finian McLonergan in Finian's Rainbow. On July 21, 1947, at age 34, he began playing Finian in his late 50s, a role that required 2 1/2 hours in makeup. He also prepared for the role by observing older people in everyday situations, taking note of such things as their infirmities, the way they walked, and their posture. His observations were so intense that at times "he was upbraided for impudently staring". He spent 18 months in that role. Other Broadway productions in which Martin appeared included The Devil's Disciple (1950), Captain Brassbound's Conversion (1950), The King of Friday's Men (1951), Spofford (1967), Lost in the Stars (1972), and The Changing Room (1973).

Later in his career, Martin acted in regional theater, including performances at the Main Street Theatre in White Plains, New York, and with the Civic Light Opera in Pittsburgh, Pennsylvania.

Martin wrote more than 100 scripts for the CBS Radio Mystery Theater, and he wrote for Adventure Theater. As an actor on radio, he portrayed Reed Bannister on Big Sister and Arnold Kirk on The Right to Happiness. Other radio programs on which he was heard included The Chase and Now Hear This.

== Personal life and death ==
Martin married actress Inge Adams in January 1942. He later married actress Joan Arliss, to whom he was still wed at the time of his death. He had two sons and two daughters. He died of a heart ailment on July 25, 1981, in Doctors' Hospital in New York City, aged 69.
