= Norman Normal =

- Title card
- Directed by: Alex Lovy
- Story by: N. Paul Stookey; Dave Dixon
- Produced by: William L. Hendricks; N. Paul Stookey
- Starring: N. Paul Stookey; Dave Dixon
- Edited by: Hal Geer
- Music by: William Lava; N. Paul Stookey (songs)
- Animation by: Ted Bonnicksen; Laverne Harding; Volus Jones; Ed Solomon
- Layouts by: John Freeman
- Backgrounds by: Bob Abrams; Ralph Penn
- Color process: Technicolor
- Production company: Warner Bros.-Seven Arts Animation
- Distributed by: Warner Bros.-Seven Arts; The Vitaphone Corporation
- Release date: February 3, 1968
- Running time: 6 minutes
- Language: English

Norman Normal is a 1968 animated cartoon short, produced by Warner Bros.-Seven Arts Animation. It was produced as a collaboration between musician Paul Stookey (of Peter, Paul and Mary fame) and the studio's animation department. Rather than being released as part of the Looney Tunes or Merrie Melodies series, it was released as a one-time "Cartoon Special".

== Storyline ==
A band plays the theme song until a ball-bearing salesman named Norman appears and closes a door on them. He introduces himself as the hero of the piece and walks down a corridor filled with doors, explaining that each of them has a different one of his problems behind it.

Norman enters a door, which takes him to his boss's office. Their company is trying to get a man named Fanshawe to buy a large consignment of ball-bearings. The boss has discovered Fanshawe is an alcoholic, so he orders Norman to take Fanshawe to a bar, get him drunk, and persuade him to sign. Norman objects on moral grounds. During the argument, the two become children, with the boss demanding that Norman bully a fellow child in order to get into the boss's gang. The two revert to adults, and the boss tries reverse psychology, wondering out loud if Norman is really suitable for the job. Norman seemingly caves in, but on exiting the office, he vows not to do what is being asked of him and to simply ask Fanshawe to sign the contract if he thinks the ball-bearings are good enough.

He then enters another door, containing his father. Norman asks his father questions about what is right and wrong, but his father merely gives Norman vague psychobabble and stories from his childhood and young adulthood. He then tells Norman that the key to success is not to make waves, and to fit in.

Walking through another door, Norman is taken to a party. A man named Leo wears a lampshade on his head and walks around repeating "Approval?" A drunken salesman congratulates Norman for closing the deal with Fanshawe and tells a joke which involves a traveling salesman mistaking an Eskimo woman for a walrus. The audience does not hear most of the joke, as Norman talks over it and tells the drunken man that he should not be telling jokes that disparage another race or minority group. Despite this, Norman laughs at its punchline anyway, seemingly out of social pressure. Norman walks over to the bar and Hal the bartender, who is also drunk, asks if he wants more to drink. Norman tells Hal that he has had enough to drink and asks for a ginger ale. Hal taunts him, accusing Norman of hating himself when he is drunk. Norman leaves out of disgust, but his departure is unnoticed by the partygoers.

Back in the corridor, Norman apologizes for the display and re-opens the door containing the band. Both the band and Norman are revealed to be inside the head of another, larger version of Norman, visible through a door. The larger Norman closes the door on his head.

== Production ==
The theme song, "Norman Normal", was previously featured on Peter, Paul and Mary's album The Peter, Paul and Mary Album (released in 1966). The title character was initially designed by pop artist Milton Glaser, and then refined by animator Volus Jones to create a character that would be easier to animate. It appeared on the shortlist for Best Animated Short at the 40th Academy Awards, but was not nominated. Further cartoons starring Norman were envisaged by Stookey, although the studio's closure the following year prevented these plans coming to fruition.

The character is unique for having no special catchphrases, not participating in any wacky antics, or doing anything typically considered "funny".

== Home media ==
The short is available on disc 4 of the Looney Tunes Golden Collection: Volume 6 DVD set.
