= Stanley Grover =

American actor and singer

- Publicity Photo of Stanley Grover
- Born: Stanley Grover Neinstendt; March 28, 1926; Woodstock, Illinois, U.S.
- Died: August 24, 1997 (aged 71); Los Angeles, California, U.S.
- Education: University of Missouri
- Occupation: Actor
- Years active: 1951–1996
- Spouse: Linda Grover
- Children: 3

Stanley Grover Neinstendt (March 20, 1926 – August 24, 1997) was an American film, television, and theatre actor.

== Life and career ==
Born in Woodstock, Illinois, Grover attended the University of Missouri, where earned his music degree. He made his theatre debut in 1951, appearing in the Broadway play, Seventeen, playing the "Singer with the Orchestra". His last theatre credit was in the Broadway play Don't Call Back in 1975.

Later in his career, Grover began appearing in films and on television. His credits include: Ghostbusters, Barnaby Jones, Network, Being There, The Falcon and the Snowman, Sisters, Dark Shadows, Old Gringo, Hardcastle and McCormick, North Dallas Forty, Fandango, Hill Street Blues, Murder, She Wrote, The Patty Duke Show and The Onion Field. He also played the recurring role of a somber judge in the legal drama TV series L.A. Law.

Grover died in August 1997 of leukemia at the UCLA Medical Center in Los Angeles, California, at the age of 71. His body was cremated.
