= Donald Richards (singer) =

American singer

- Born: March 24, 1919; New York City
- Died: September 26, 1953 (aged 34); Ridgewood, New Jersey
- Occupations: Stage actor, singer

Donald Richards (March 24, 1919 – September 26, 1953) was an American singer and actor. He is best known in his short career for having created the role of Woody Mahoney in Finian's Rainbow.

Richards was born in New York City on March 24, 1919, and attended Theodore Roosevelt High School there. He went on to attend Columbia University, and he often sang on radio stations in New York City while he was a student at both schools. Laszlo Halasz, conductor for New York's City Center Opera company, tutored Richards and advised him to aim for a career on stage.

Richards's ambition to sing opera was fulfilled when he had lead roles in the St. Louis Grand Opera's productions of Faust and Pagliacci. However, after he was moved to the chorus he turned his focus to more commercial activities, with his first hotel date being a 35-week stay in St. Louis. He also sang in road companies of Folies Bergere and Streets of Paris and in night clubs in New York City.

Richards was drafted into the U. S. Army on December 8, 1941, and he sang in a service production of Winged Victory for 22 months. He also made 1200 benefit performances for sick and wounded military personnel in hospitals. After his 1945 discharge, he performed in singing engagements for hotels in the Statler chain, including a nine-week stay in the Mayfair Room at the Blackstone Hotel in Chicago. There an aunt of Burton Lane, composer of the music for Finian's Rainbow, saw his performance, leading to his role in that play. He also performed on Broadway in Winged Victory (1943) and Along Fifth Avenue (1949).

Richards died on September 26, 1953, in Ridgewood, New Jersey.

== Music theater credits ==
- 1943 Winged Victory
- 1947 Finian's Rainbow
- 1949 Along Fifth Avenue
