= Ella Logan =

Scottish-American actress and singer

- Born: Georgina Armour Allan; 6 March 1913; Glasgow, Scotland
- Died: 1 May 1969 (aged 56); Burlingame, California, U.S.
- Occupations: Actress, singer
- Spouses: Charles John Lepsch (m. 1932, divorced) Fred Finklehoffe (m. 1942; div. 1954)
- Children: 1

Ella Logan (born Georgina Armour Allan; 6 March 1913 – 1 May 1969) was a Scottish-American actress and singer who appeared on Broadway, recorded and had a nightclub career in the United States and internationally.

== Early years ==
Logan was born as Georgina Armour Allan in Glasgow on 6 March 1913, where she was raised. Her birth was registered later the same month. She began performing under the name Ella Allan as a child. In 1934, however, for unknown reasons, Logan, a.k.a. Mrs. Georgina Allan Lepsch, gave her year of birth as 1910 on her U.S. Petition for Naturalization, #227616, dated 14 May 1934 and filed with the Southern District of New York, District and Circuit Court.

== Career ==
Logan was a band singer in music halls and in 1930 she made her recording debut just before her 17th birthday, as a vocalist for the Jack Hylton Orchestra recording the songs "Moanin' Low" and "Can't We Be Friends?" for His Master's Voice. She toured Europe before migrating to the U.S. in the 1930s.

Her stage career in the United States began with an appearance in the Broadway musical revue Calling All Stars in 1934. She sang at various clubs and to record jazz on the British Columbia label (part of EMI). She then appeared in several Hollywood films, including Flying Hostess (1936), Woman Chases Man (1937), Top of the Town (film) (1937), 52nd Street (1937) and The Goldwyn Follies (1938), in which she introduced the Gershwins' "I Was Doing All Right". Logan signed a lengthy recording contract with Brunswick Records and its new owner Columbia Records in 1937, for whom she recorded two songs from The Goldwyn Follies and four songs from her 1939 appearance in George White's Scandals. She also appeared in several other Broadway shows including Sons o' Fun in 1941, and Show Time in 1942. She traveled extensively to Europe and then Africa during World War II to entertain the troops. She also appeared on numerous TV shows in the 1940s and '50s, including The Ed Wynn Show, Cavalcade of Stars, and The Colgate Comedy Hour.

Logan returned to Broadway in 1947 starring as Sharon McLonergan in the original production of Finian's Rainbow, introducing the show's most famous songs, "How Are Things in Glocca Morra?", "Look to the Rainbow" and "That Old Devil Moon", among others. The production ran for 725 performances. She did not return to Broadway after that. In 1954, she was cast in a proposed animated film adaptation of Finian's Rainbow and re-recorded the score with Frank Sinatra. But the film was canceled, and the recordings were not released until the 2002 box set Sinatra in Hollywood 1940-1964. The original cast album was released in 1948, and was Columbia Records' second Original Cast album. The first was the 1946 Broadway revival of Show Boat.

She recorded the show's score for a second time in 1954 for the LP Ella Logan Sings Favorites from Finian's Rainbow, accompanied by pianist George Greeley. It was released by Capitol Records in 1955 (H-561 in the US, and L-561 in Australia), and included her versions of songs she did not sing in the show such as "Necessity" and "The Begat" This was the second of her two solo albums. The first was a collection of eight songs for Majestic Records in 1945.

Logan's career was hampered by the FBI, which reportedly suspected her of having communist ties but never found any evidence to support such allegations. The FBI kept a file on her from 1945 until 1961, placed her Los Angeles house under surveillance, and monitored her activities and travels, which resulted in being searched while traveling to New York, due to suspicions she was a “Russian courier agent”. Due to John J. Huber's Senate Judiciary Committee testimony of 1950, Logan was listed as a Communist sympathizer in Red Channels.

In May 1956, she appeared on television in London with Louis Armstrong and His All-Stars. In 1965, she was part of the cast of the musical Kelly, until her role was cut during out of town tryouts. She continued to work occasionally in clubs, on television, and in theatrical stock productions, into the 1960s.

== Family ==
Her first husband was Milwaukee, Wisconsin native Charles John Lepsch, whom she married on April 16, 1932 in the Parish Church in the Parish of St James, Westminster in the County of London. After that union ended, she met her soon-to-be second husband, American film writer and producer Fred Finklehoffe, a playwright and producer, when he was co-librettist for the 1940 musical Hi Ya, Gentlemen. They were married in 1942, had one daughter, Binnie Quinn, and divorced in 1954. Her niece was actress and noted jazz singer Annie Ross and her nephew was Jimmy Logan, a Scottish actor. Ross had been sent as a child to live with Logan in Beverly Hills, where she was raised.

== Death ==
Ella Logan died of cancer in Burlingame, California, on 1 May 1969, aged 56.
