= Barbara Hancock =

American actress and dancer (born 1949)

Barbara Hancock (born November 21, 1949) is an American actress and dancer. While she was with the Harkness Ballet, she appeared as a dancing character in five productions in television and film. She was nominated for the 1968 Golden Globe Award for Best Supporting Actress in a Motion Picture for her role as Susan the Silent in Finian's Rainbow.

== Filmography ==
- Tarzan (1968) as Minette, in episode "Trina"
- Finian's Rainbow (1968) as Susan the Silent
- Cry for Poor Wally (1969) as Betsy
- The Night God Screamed (1971) as Nancy Coogan
- Fair Play (1972 television film) as Pearlie Purvis
