= Yip Harburg =

American lyricist (1896–1981)

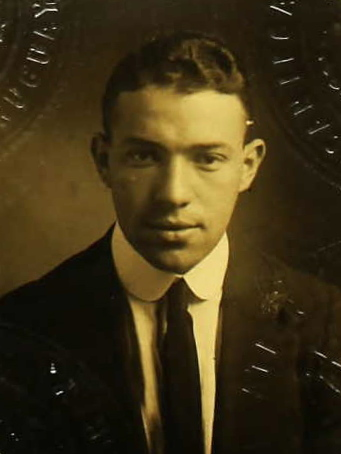
- Harburg in 1920

Background information
- Also known as: E. Y. Harburg; Yipsel Harburg
- Born: Isidore Hochberg; April 8, 1896; New York City, U.S.
- Died: March 5, 1981 (aged 84) Los Angeles, California, U.S.
- Occupations: Lyricist; librettist

Edgar Yipsel "Yip" Harburg (born Isidore Hochberg; April 8, 1896 – March 5, 1981) was an American popular song lyricist and librettist who worked with many well-known composers. He wrote the lyrics to the standards "Brother, Can You Spare a Dime?" (with Jay Gorney), "April in Paris", and "It's Only a Paper Moon", as well as all of the songs for the film The Wizard of Oz, including "Over the Rainbow". Harburg was known for the social commentary of his lyrics, as well as his left-wing political leanings. He championed racial, sexual, and gender equality and labor unionism, and was an ardent critic of high society and religion.

== Biography ==
=== Early life and career ===
Harburg, the youngest of four surviving children (out of ten), was born Isidore Hochberg on the Lower East Side of New York City on April 8, 1896. His parents, Lewis Hochberg and Mary Ricing, were Yiddish-speaking Orthodox Jews who had emigrated from Russia.

He later adopted the name "Edgar Yipsel Harburg", and came to be best known as "Yip". Harburg told Studs Terkel that he took the name "Yipsel" because it meant "squirrel" in Yiddish, but there is no such Yiddish word and it is possible that the name was derived from that of the Young People's Socialist League (1907), the youth group of the Socialist Party of America, whose members were called "yipsels".

Harburg’s love of theater came from his boyhood visits with his father to Yiddish theater and vaudeville reviews. His love of rhyme and wordplay was nurtured hearing Mother Goose nursery rhymes and, later, learning the poetry of Tennyson, Longfellow, Kipling and other late Victorian poets, and “light verse of all kinds.”

Harburg attended Townsend Harris Hall Prep School, where he and Ira Gershwin worked on the school paper and became lifelong friends. They bonded over a shared fondness for Gilbert and Sullivan. Until he met Gershwin, Harburg knew of W. S. Gilbert only as a writer of light verse, especially the collection Bab Ballads. When Harburg shared Gilbert's poems with his friend, Gershwin informed him that many of Gilbert's poems were in fact lyrics that went with music. As Harburg wrote later, Gershwin took him home and played him H.M.S. Pinafore. "There were all the lines I knew by heart put to music. I was dumfounded, staggered." Though it would take a few years, it helped set him on the course to be a lyricist.

According to his son Ernie Harburg, Gilbert and Irish dramatist George Bernard Shaw taught his father—a "democratic socialist, [and] sworn challenger of all tyranny against the people"—that "'humor is an act of courage' and dissent".

When the United States entered the First World War, Harburg, a conscientious objector, moved to Uruguay for three years because he did not believe in the war and refused to fight. After World War I, Harburg returned to New York and graduated from City College (later part of the City University of New York), which Ira Gershwin had initially attended with him, in 1921. After Harburg married and had two children, he started writing light verse for local newspapers. He became a co-owner of Consolidated Electrical Appliance Company, but the company went bankrupt following the crash of 1929, leaving Harburg "anywhere from $50,000 – $70,000 in debt", which he insisted on paying back over the course of the next few decades. At this point, Harburg and Ira Gershwin agreed that Harburg should start writing song lyrics.

Gershwin introduced Harburg to Jay Gorney, who collaborated with him on songs for an Earl Carroll Broadway revue (Earl Carroll's Sketchbook): the show was successful and Harburg was engaged as lyricist for a series of successful revues, including Americana in 1932, for which he wrote the lyrics of "Brother, Can You Spare a Dime?" to the tune of a lullaby Gorney had learned as a child in Russia. This song swept the nation, becoming an anthem of the Great Depression.

Harburg was a staunch critic of both high society and religion. He wrote a poem entitled "Atheist" that summarized his views on God.

=== Hollywood and Broadway ===
Harburg and Gorney were offered a contract with Paramount. In Hollywood, Harburg worked with composers Harold Arlen, Vernon Duke, Jerome Kern, Jule Styne, and Burton Lane, and later wrote the lyrics for The Wizard of Oz, one of the earliest known "integrated musicals".

Of his work on The Wizard of Oz, his son (and biographer) Ernie Harburg has said:

So anyhow, Yip also wrote all the dialogue in that time and the setup to the songs and he also wrote the part where they give out the heart, the brains and the nerve, because he was the final script editor. And he—there were eleven screenwriters on that—and he pulled the whole thing together, wrote his own lines and gave the thing a coherence and unity which made it a work of art. But he doesn't get credit for that. He gets lyrics by E. Y. Harburg, you see. But nevertheless, he put his influence on the thing.

Working in Hollywood did not stop Harburg's career on Broadway. In the 1940s, he wrote a series of "book" musicals with social messages, including the successful Bloomer Girl (1944), set during the Civil War, which was about temperance and women's rights activist Amelia Bloomer, and which celebrated equality for women, Abolitionism, and the Underground Railroad. Harburg's best known Broadway show, Finian's Rainbow (1947) was, in its original production, possibly the first Broadway musical with a racially integrated chorus line. Its plot satirized American financial practices and criticized reactionist politicians, mistreatment of the working classes as well as racism and the Jim Crow laws. It was made into a film in 1968 starring Fred Astaire and Petula Clark, directed by Francis Ford Coppola.

=== Blacklisting ===
Although never a member of the Communist Party (he was a member of the Socialist Party, and joked that "Yip" referred to the Young People's Socialist League, nicknamed the "Yipsels"), Harburg had been involved in radical groups, and was blacklisted.

Harburg was named in a pamphlet Red Channels: The Report of Communist Influence in Radio and Television; his involvement with the Hollywood Democratic Committee, and his refusal to identify reputed communists, led to him being blocked from working in Hollywood films, television, and radio for twelve full years, from 1950 to 1962. "As the writer of the lyric of the song 'God's Country', I am outraged by the suggestion that somehow I am connected with, believe in, or am sympathetic with Communist or totalitarian philosophy", he wrote to the House Un-American Activities Committee in 1950. He was unable to travel abroad during this period because his passport had been revoked.

=== Later career ===
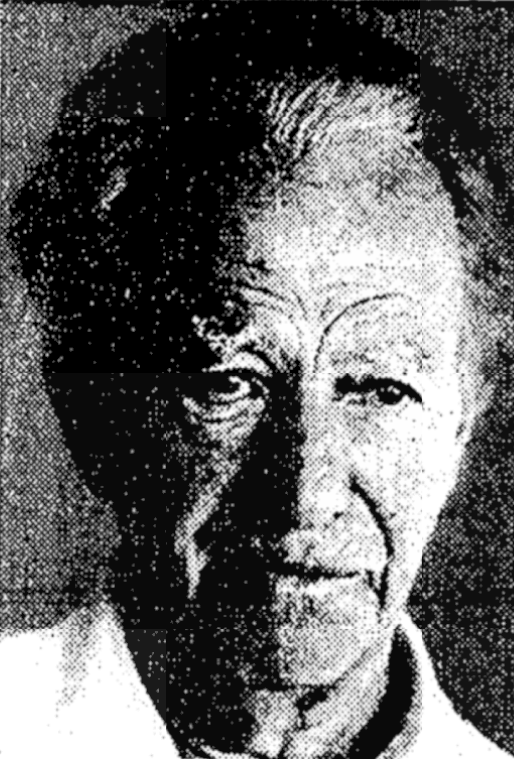
Harburg in old age

With a score by Sammy Fain and Harburg's lyrics, the musical Flahooley (1951) satirized the country's anti-communist sentiment, but it closed after forty performances at the Broadhurst Theatre on Broadway. The New York critics were dismissive of the show, although it had been a success during its earlier pre-Broadway run in Philadelphia.

In 1966, songwriter Earl Robinson sought Harburg's help for the song "Hurry Sundown"; the two collaborated on the song and are credited as co-writers. The song was intended for the film Hurry Sundown, but was not used in the film. It was, however, recorded by Peter, Paul and Mary for their 1966 album The Peter, Paul and Mary Album. The song was released as a single in 1967, and reached No. 37 on the Billboard Easy Listening chart. It was also nominated for the Grammy Award for Best Folk Recording.

=== Death ===
Harburg died while driving on Sunset Boulevard in Los Angeles on March 5, 1981, at the age of 84. While he was initially reported to have been killed in a traffic accident, it was later determined that he suffered a heart attack while stopped at a red light.

== Awards and recognition ==
In 1940 Harburg and Harold Arlen won an Academy Award for Best Original Song for "Over the Rainbow". In addition, he and Arlen were nominated for that award in 1944 for "Happiness Is Just a Thing Called Joe" from Cabin in the Sky, and in 1946 he and Jerome Kern were nominated for "More and More" from Can't Help Singing.

Jamaica, a vehicle for Lena Horne, was nominated for a Tony Award for Best Musical in 1958.

Harburg was inducted into the Songwriters Hall of Fame in 1972 and awarded its Johnny Mercer Award in 1981.

On March 7, 2001, the "Songs of the Century" poll conducted by the Recording Industry Association of America and the National Endowment for the Arts ranked Judy Garland's rendition of "Over the Rainbow" as the number one recording of the 20th century.

On June 22, 2004, the American Film Institute broadcast AFI's 100 Years...100 Songs, a TV special announcing their selection of the 100 greatest film songs. "Over the Rainbow" was Number One, and "Ding-Dong! The Witch Is Dead" was Number 82.

In April 2005, the United States Postal Service issued a commemorative stamp recognizing Harburg's accomplishments. The stamp was drawn from a portrait taken by photographer Barbara Bordnick in 1978 along with a rainbow and lyric from "Over the Rainbow". The first day ceremony was held at the 92nd Street Y in New York.

== Stage shows ==
- Earl Carroll's Sketchbook of 1929 (revue, 1929) – contributing lyricist
- Garrick Gaieties (revue, 1930) – contributing lyricist
- Earl Carroll's Vanities of 1930 (revue, 1930) – contributing lyricist
- Simple Simon (musical, 1930) – contributing lyricist
- The Vanderbilt Revue (revue, 1930) – contributing lyricist
- Accidentally Yours (musical, 1931) – lyricist
- Billy Rose's Crazy Quilt (revue, 1931) – contributing lyricist
- Shoot the Works (revue, 1931) – contributing lyricist
- Ziegfeld Follies of 1931 (revue, 1931) – contributing lyricist
- Americana (revue, 1932) – lyricist
- Ballyhoo of 1932 (revue, 1932) – lyricist
- The Great Magoo (play, 1932) – co-lyricist
- Walk a Little Faster (revue, 1932) – lyricist
- Continental Varieties (revue, 1934) – contributing lyricist
- Life Begins at 8:40 (revue, 1934) – co-lyricist with Ira Gershwin, co-bookwriter
- New Faces (revue, 1934) – contributing co-lyricist
- Ziegfeld Follies of 1934 (revue, 1934) – lyricist (for about half of the numbers)
- Stop Press (revue, 1935) – contributing lyricist
- The Show is On (revue, 1936) – contributing lyricist
- Hooray for What! (musical, 1937) – originator and lyricist
- Sticks and Stones (revue, 1939) – contributing lyricist
- Hold On to Your Hats (musical, 1940) – lyricist
- Bloomer Girl (musical, 1944) – originator, lyricist and director for musical numbers
- Blue Holiday (revue, 1945) – contributing lyricist
- Finian's Rainbow (musical, 1947) – originator, lyricist and co-bookwriter
- Flahooley (musical, 1951) and its revisions – originator, lyricist, and co-bookwriter
- Jamaica (musical, 1957) – originator, lyricist, co-bookwriter and co-director
- The Happiest Girl in the World (musical, 1961) – originator and lyricist
- Darling of the Day (musical, 1968) – lyricist
- The Children's Crusade (musical, 1971) – lyricist
- The Great Man's Whiskus [sic] (television show, 1973) – lyricist

See also Musicals by Yip Harburg.

== Films ==
Harburg wrote lyrics for most or all of the original songs for these films:

- The Sap from Syracuse (1930, music by Johnny Green)
- Moonlight and Pretzels (1933, music by Jay Gorney and Sammy Fain)
- The Singing Kid (1936, music by Harold Arlen)
- Stage Struck (1936, music by Harold Arlen)
- Gold Diggers of 1937 (1936, music by Harold Arlen)
- The Wizard of Oz (1939, music by Harold Arlen)
- At the Circus (1939, music by Harold Arlen)
- Ship Ahoy (1942, music by Burton Lane)
- Cairo (1942, music by Arthur Schwartz)
- Cabin in the Sky (1943, music by Harold Arlen)
- Kismet (1944)
- Can't Help Singing (1944, music by Jerome Kern)
- California (1947, music by Earl Robinson)
- Gay Purr-ee (1962, music by Harold Arlen)
- Finian's Rainbow (1968, music by Burton Lane)

He wrote lyrics for original songs for many other films, and hundreds of additional films reused his songs.

== Notable songs ==
Harburg wrote the lyrics for more than 500 songs. The following (all listed in) are some of the most notable for their popularity or social importance.

- "April in Paris", with Vernon Duke (1932)
- "Brother, Can You Spare a Dime?", with Jay Gorney (1932)
- "It's Only a Paper Moon", with Harold Arlen (1933)
- "Last Night When We Were Young", with Harold Arlen (1935)
- "I Love to Sing-a", with Harold Arlen, for the film The Singing Kid (1936)
- "Down with Love", with Harold Arlen, for the musical Hooray for What! (1937)
- "Over the Rainbow", "Ding-Dong! The Witch Is Dead" and others, with Harold Arlen, for the film The Wizard of Oz (1939)
- "Lydia the Tattooed Lady", with Harold Arlen, for the film At the Circus (1939)
- "And Russia Was Her Name", with Jerome Kern, for the film Song of Russia (1943)
- "Happiness Is a Thing Called Joe", with Harold Arlen, for the film Cabin in the Sky (1943)
- "The Eagle and Me", and "Right as the Rain" with Harold Arlen, for the musical Bloomer Girl (1944)
- "Free and Equal Blues", with Earl Robinson, performed by Josh White (1944)
- "How Are Things in Glocca Morra?", "Old Devil Moon" and others, with Burton Lane, for the musical Finian's Rainbow (1946)
- "Cocoanut Sweet", with Harold Arlen, for the musical Jamaica (1957)

See also Songs with lyrics by Yip Harburg.

== Books ==
- Harburg, E.Y. (1965). Rhymes for the Irreverent. New York: Grossman. ISBN 0670597341.
- Harburg, E.Y. (1976). At This Point in Rhyme: E.Y. Harburg's Poems. New York: Crown. ISBN 0517527278.
- Harburg, Yip (2006). Rhymes for the Irreverent. Madison, Wisconsin: Freedom From Religion Foundation. ISBN 1877733156. Contains material from Rhymes for the Irreverent (1965) and At This Point in Rhyme, and previously unpublished poems.
