= Muriel Bentley =

American ballet dancer

- Born: Muriel Siegal; June 26, 1917; New York City
- Died: March 8, 1999 (aged 81); Woodland Hills, California
- Occupation: Ballet dancer
- Years active: 1930s to 1950s

Muriel Siegal Bentley (June 26, 1917 – March 8, 1999) was an American ballet dancer. She was a member of the Ballet Theatre of New York. She created roles in works by Antony Tudor, Agnes de Mille and Jerome Robbins, and danced the role of Anita in West Side Story on Broadway from 1957 to 1959.

== Early life and education ==
Muriel Siegal was born in New York City, the daughter of Samuel A. (Max) Siegal and Marie (May) Rothman Siegal. Her grandparents were all Jewish immigrants from Russia; her father was an accountant. She attended the Metropolitan Opera ballet school. Her dance mentors included Anton Dolin and Ruth St. Denis.

== Career ==
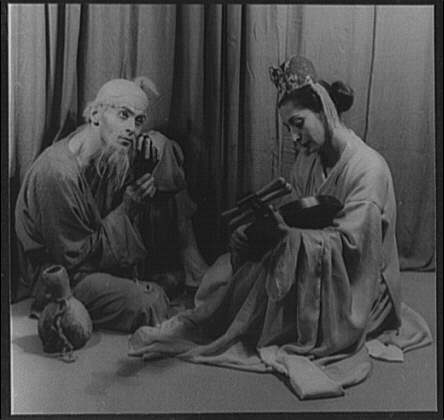
Carl Van Vechten, Portrait of Hugh Laing and Muriel Bentley, in Shadow of the Wind (1948)

Bentley was a member of the Ballet Theatre of New York with Jerome Robbins, Alicia Alonso, Nora Kaye, Harold Lang, Janet Reed, and others. Her Broadway appearances included roles in Interplay (1946), Fancy Free (1946), Call Me Madam (1950), and West Side Story (1957 to 1959). She also appeared as a dancer on television, in The Kate Smith Hour (1950). She had important roles in several Agnes de Mille ballets, including Tally-Ho (1945) and Fall River Legend (1948), and in Pillar of Fire and Shadow of the Wind (1948) by Antony Tudor. Of her 1945 appearance in Tally-Ho!, The New York Times critic John Martin wrote that "Muriel Bentley practically walks away with the show, as the hilariously vulgar 'lady'".

After she retired from the stage, Bentley was an interior decorator and a theatrical agent. She wrote about the early years of the American Ballet Theatre for the Los Angeles Times in 1979.

== Personal life ==
Bentley died in Woodland Hills, California in 1999, at the age of 81.
