= Through the Crystal Ball =

1949 American television series

- Country of origin: United States
- Original language: English
- No. of seasons: 1
- No. of episodes: 6

Production
- Producer: Paul Belanger

Original release
- Network: CBS
- Release: April 18 – June 6, 1949

Through the Crystal Ball is a 1949 American television series dedicated to storytelling through dance. Produced by Paul Belanger, it was a 30-minute live program which aired on Monday nights on CBS-TV. Each episode presented a literary classic, incorporating elements of classical and contemporary ballet, as well as pantomime. The first four shows included narration by host Jimmy Savo, a comedian and mime artist, and featured the works of leading choreographers including George Balanchine, Michael Kidd, Helen Tamiris, and Todd Bolender. The series was sponsored by the Ford Dealers of America.

== Concept ==
The series was introduced as a novel, creative, and ambitious concept, pushing the boundaries of television as a medium. Advanced publicity for Through the Crystal Ball billing it as "one of the first programs to use television as an art form". The J. Walter Thompson Agency called it "the first big-time TV program created purely for television".

The show opened with Jimmy Savo holding up a crystal ball, which would transport viewers into a fantasy land, where they would find themselves on stage in the midst of the action. Each week, a cast of 20 to 30 performers in elaborate costumes presented classics from children's literature through dance and pantomime. Through the Crystal Ball was unusually costly to produce, bringing together highly regarded dancers, choreographers, actors, writers, costume designers, and set designers of the day.

== Featured works ==
The television premiere on April 18, 1949, was a production of Daniel Defoe's Robinson Crusoe, choreographed by Michael Kidd, who also danced in the title role. Other lead dancers included Anita Alvarez as Girl Friday and Talley Beatty as the Native Chief. One of the main scenes depicted Crusoe building a home on the deserted island, with the assistance of an energetic group of monkeys, who were played by 10 dancers in furry costumes.

A new version of Cinderella choreographed for television by George Balanchine and danced by Tanaquil Le Clercq and Herbert Bliss, was broadcast on April 25, 1949. It was followed by Ali Baba, choreographed by Helen Tamiris, which aired on May 2, 1949.

The Wild West, an original work choreographed by Todd Bolender, starred Joan McCracken along with Tommy Rawl and Muriel Bentley, and aired on May 9, 1949. Gulliver's Travels, choreographed by Hanya Holm, was also featured on May 9. Savo left the show on May 14.

Alice in Wonderland, choreographed by Pauline Koner, was broadcast on May 23, 1949. The dance was cut down to the most iconic scenes from the original Lewis Carroll story. Bambi Linn, who had played Alice on Broadway, danced the title role. Other lead dancers included Kate Friedlich as the White Rabbit, Lavinia Neilson as the Duchess, and Beverly Bozeman as the Queen of Hearts. Actor Arthur Treacher played the Cheshire Cat. One of the cameras blew out during the live broadcast.

The final episode of Through the Crystal Ball featured Casey at the Bat, and aired on June 6, 1949. It was based on the baseball-themed poem by Ernest Thayer, and was choreographed by Paul Godkin. The narrator was Clay Clement.

== Critical reception ==
Critics generally recognized that the concept behind Through the Crystal Ball was groundbreaking in bringing dance to new audiences and demonstrating how television could be used. In a nationally syndicated review, media critic John Crosby called it "television's equivalent of the first symphony programs presented on radio". Writing for The Washington Star, Harry MacArthur said, "despite any reservations, it is as far as television has gone yet in the right direction away from radio. The use of visual movement to tell a story, rather than illustrating words with pictures, is certainly progress."

At the same time, many critics lamented the difficulty of trying to capture dance on television. The first few episodes – Robinson Crusoe, Cinderella, and Ali Baba – were particularly awkward. Jack Gould wrote in a critical New York Times review that Kidd, Balanchine, and Tamiris has "suffered from a common failing" in choreographing for the theatre stage rather than for television. According to Gould:

Whether the classic or modern form has been employed, the concept each week has been too elaborate and too complicated for the scope of the television camera, the screen at home being badly overcrowded...The meaning of the dance has been largely lost, if only because the principals time and again are cut off at the thighs and the ensemble effect is chopped up into microscopic bits and pieces, with all sense of continuity and fluidity being lost. The restless camera, trying desperately to compensate for its inability to match the range of vision of the human eye, has only added to the viewer's case of jitters.

Meanwhile, Crosby blamed the television industry's reluctance at the time to use long shots, because television screens were so small. In addition, he pointed out that the camera shots were too low to do justice to ballet, because the television studio ceilings did not allow the cameras to be positioned high enough.

Critics questioned whether a narrator was needed and whether Jimmy Savo was a fit for the show. On May 14, 1949, it was announced that Savo had "retired" from the program, and that no replacement was expected.

=== Cancellation ===
Although the program improved as the production team gained experience, according to Crosby, Ford remained "nervous" about public reception to the "experiment". After less than two months on the air, the series was concluded earlier than its original end date of July 4, 1949. Critic John Lester wrote in The Newark Star-Ledger that "The show had flashes of real brilliance even though most of the series was bad". Arguing that "Television needs shows like Through the Crystal Ball", he regretted that Ford did not have more patience as a sponsor, saying, "I'm certain it would have developed in time, the idea being too great and the talent too fine to fail".
