= James Jamieson (dancer) =

American dancer (1920–1993)

James Jamieson (1920 – December 25, 1993) was an American dancer, who was a specialist in Highland dancing, and is best remembered for both performing in and restaging Agnes de Mille's Brigadoon.

Jamieson (also known as Jamie Jamieson) was a native of Evanston, Illinois, and studied at Northwestern University. He began his career in ballet, but by the mid-1940s was an internationally recognized Scottish dance champion. In 1947, de Mille hired Jamieson to coach the cast of Brigadoon in traditional Scottish dancing, which inaugurated a decades-long association with the musical. (He had earlier worked with de Mille on the first national tour of Oklahoma!) Jamieson replaced James Mitchell as Harry Beaton, then went on to play Harry on tour, overseas, and in assorted stock productions. In New York, he recreated de Mille's choreography for Brigadoon at New York City Center in 1957, on Broadway in 1980, and at New York City Opera in 1986 and 1991; in addition, he was de Mille's assistant for the 1963 City Center revival, which starred Edward Villella as Harry. De Mille also featured Jamieson in the Agnes de Mille Dance Theatre and the Heritage Dance Theatre, as well as in television specials.

Besides his various productions of Brigadoon, Jamieson choreographed for a number of regional and stock theatres, working with such stars as Judy Holliday. He had considerably greater influence, however, as a dance teacher. With Helena Antonova, he opened the Academy of the Dance in 1956 in Wilmington, Delaware; his students there included modern dancer Tina Fehlandt, Scottish dancer Victor Wesley, and choreographer Susan Stroman.

In 1967, Jamieson began his celebrated productions of Tchaikovsky's The Nutcracker Ballet, and for 27 consecutive years, he produced, directed and performed various roles in the work. Jamieson died on Christmas Day, 1993, nine days after he appeared as the grandmother in the opening-night presentation of the Academy of the Dance's 27th production of The Nutcracker.

The Delaware Community Foundation offers the James Jamieson Memorial Scholarship to ballet students on a competitive basis.
