= Mel Tomlinson =

American dancer and choreographer (1954–2019)

- Born: January 3, 1954; Raleigh, North Carolina, U.S.
- Died: February 5, 2019 (aged 65); Huntersville, North Carolina
- Education: John W. Ligon Senior High School; North Carolina School of the Arts; Carolina University of Theology
- Occupations: Ballet dancer, modern dancer, minister
- Career
- Former groups: Agnes de Mille Dance Theatre; Dance Theatre of Harlem; Alvin Ailey American Dance Theater; New York City Ballet; North Carolina Dance Theatre; Boston Ballet

Mel Alexander Tomlinson (January 3, 1954 – February 5, 2019) was an American dancer and choreographer. At the time of his debut with the New York City Ballet in 1981, he was the only African-American dancer in the company. Ballet choreographer Agnes de Mille referred to Tomlinson as "the most exciting black dancer in America." Throughout his ballet career, he danced with New York City Ballet, Alvin Ailey American Dance Theater, Agnes de Mille Dance Theatre, North Carolina Dance Theatre, and Boston Ballet. In his later life, Tomlinson received a degree from Carolina University of Theology and was ordained as a Baptist minister.

== Early life ==
Tomlinson was born in Raleigh, North Carolina, and grew up in the Chavis Heights public housing neighborhood in Southeast Raleigh. He began dancing while a student at Fred J. Carnage Junior High School, taking lessons from Betty Kovach. In the 1960s he attended the segregated John W. Ligon Senior High School, where he studied dance and gymnastics. He went on to earn a B.F.A. in dance at the North Carolina School of the Arts.

== Career ==
Tomlinson began his professional dance career as a principal dancer with Agnes de Mille Heritage Dance Theater, which was founded at the North Carolina School of the Arts. In 1974 Tomlinson moved to New York City to join Dance Theatre of Harlem, choosing the company after also receiving invitations from Joffrey Ballet and Boston Ballet. He was promoted to soloist with Dance Theatre of Harlem, performing in Manifestations, Swan Lake, and Scheherazade. He later took leave from Dance Theatre of Harlem to join Alvin Ailey American Dance Theater; dancing in Pas de Duke and The Time Before the Time After. Tomlinson joined the New York City Ballet in 1981; at the time the only African-American dancer at the company. He made his debut at New York City Ballet on November 27, 1981, in George Balanchine's Agon, dancing with Heather Watts.

In 1983, Tomlinson received the first annual North Carolina Prize for outstanding work in the visual or performing arts. In 1987 Tomlinson retired from New York City Ballet, having reached the rank of soloist, and moved back to North Carolina to join the faculty at the University of North Carolina School of the Arts. He came out of retirement to dance as a principal dancer for the North Carolina Dance Theatre under the direction of Salvatore Aiello. In 1991 he left North Carolina Dance Theatre and joined Boston Ballet as a principal dancer and master teacher in the CITYDANCE program, dancing with the company until 1994. Tomlinson also taught at Boston Conservatory of Music, Harvard University, the University of North Carolina at Charlotte, the School at Greensboro Ballet, and Charlotte Ballet.

== Personal life ==
Tomlinson was openly gay. He was diagnosed with HIV in the 1990s and developed AIDS. On December 8, 1998, Tomlinson was admitted into the House of Mercy, a ministry of the Catholic Sisters of Mercy in Belmont, North Carolina that assists people in the final stages of AIDS. Staff there expected him to die within six months. He made a slow recovery and was discharged from the house on September 10, 2000.

Tomlinson received a Ph.D. from Carolina University of Theology and was ordained as a Baptist minister.

Tomlinson later lived in Charlotte, North Carolina, and was a dance teacher and director of The Hallelujah Dance Corps at St. Paul Baptist Church. He died on February 5, 2019, at the age of 65.
