= Agnes de Mille Dance Theatre =

The Agnes de Mille Dance Theatre toured the United States from 1953 to 1954 under the aegis of producer Sol Hurok. The company offered an overview of Agnes de Mille's choreography to that date, with the addition of Anna Sokolow's "Short Lecture & Demonstration on the Evolution of Ragtime" (set to music by Billy Taylor) and Danny Daniels's "Razamatazz" (set to music by Jelly Roll Morton). In addition to several of de Mille's early pieces, the company performed the Bloomer Girl waltz and ballets based on the original dances for Brigadoon (Ballad, later reworked as Bitter Weird) and Paint Your Wagon (Gold Rush, televised in 1958 with Gemze de Lappe, James Mitchell, and Sono Osato). There is no known visual record of the full repertory, although archival footage exists of Ballad and the finale, "Hell on Wheels--1863".

There were twenty performers in the company, many of whom had worked for de Mille before. The leads were de Mille favorites James Mitchell, Gemze de Lappe and Lidija Franklin, with secondary roles taken by Virginia Bosler, tap dancer and choreographer Danny Daniels, Loren Hightower, the specialist in Scottish dance James Jamieson, Bunty Kelley, Casimir Kokic, Evelyn Taylor and Dusty Worrall. The ensemble and understudies included Edmund Balin, Robert Calder, Eleanor Fairchild, Jean Houloose, Alfa Liepa, Mavis Ray and Lizanne Truex. Rufus Smith and Raimonda Orselli provided the singing.

In 1974, de Mille revived the company as the Agnes de Mille Heritage Dance Theatre, in association with the University of North Carolina School of the Arts. Mel Tomlinson was a principal dancer in the revived Heritage Dance Theatre.
