= Pillar of Fire (ballet) =

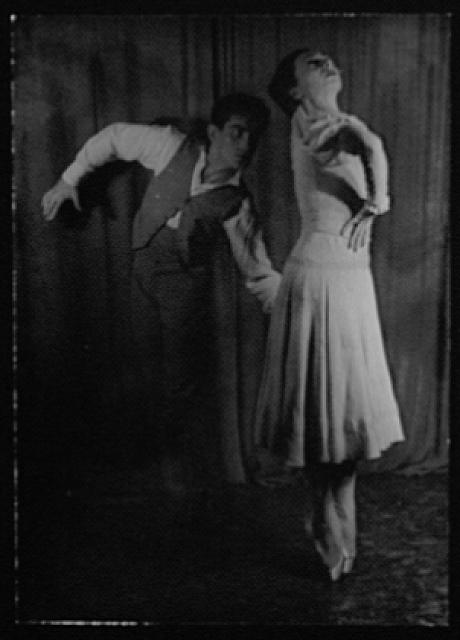
Hugh Laing and Nora Kaye in Pillar of Fire

Pillar of Fire is a 30-minute dramatic ballet choreographed in the 1940s by Antony Tudor to Arnold Schoenberg's Verklärte Nacht (Transfigured Night), Op. 4. The music was inspired by a nineteenth century German poem, "Weib und die Welt" (Woman and the World), that is set in a time when a child born out of wedlock was not condoned in polite society. The poem deals with a pregnant woman who is afraid that her fiancé will not marry her. However, he is truly in love with her and accepts the fact of her pregnancy. He tells her that the child will be considered his.

The ballet was Tudor's first piece choreographed in the United States after moving from his home in London. It follows a similar story to that of the music's inspiration. A young woman named Hagar faces great emotional and physical anguish that forms the core story of the ballet.

== Performance history ==
The performance was first produced by Ballet Theatre (now American Ballet Theatre) at the Metropolitan Opera House on April 8, 1942. It played an important role in building the foundation for American Ballet Theatre's future as a well-known company. The opening night cast included Nora Kaye as Hagar, Antony Tudor as The Friend, Hugh Laing as The Young Man From the House Opposite, Lucia Chase as the Eldest Sister, and Annabelle Lyon as the Youngest Sister; with Maria Karnilova, Charles Dickson, Jean Davidson, John Kriza, Virginia Wilcox, Wallace Seibert, Jean Hunt, Barbara Fallis, Sono Osato, Rosella Hightower, Muriel Bentley, Jerome Robbins, Donald Saddler, Frank Hobi, Balina Razoumova, and Roszika Sabo.

== Synopsis ==
American Ballet Theatre describes the performance in full extensive detail in its archives. It is set in a small country town circa 1900 (perhaps in Schoenberg's Austria). The town is made up of Hagar's prude, judgmental neighbors as well as plenty of licentious men and their hedonistic women. Hagar foresees herself succumbing to the same fate as her elder sister, who is a lonely spinster, because the man she unrequitedly loves seems to show preference for her flirtatious younger sister.

In desperation, Hagar offers herself to one of the licentious men whom she does not love. Immediately after the encounter, he abandons her. She is then shunned by her prude, judgmental neighbors and is left distraught by her hasty decision. However, the resulting crisis unites her with the one she really loves. He comes to her and they dance together rapturously.

It is said the ballet is set in 1900 because it was then that Schoenberg composed its music Verklärte Nacht ("Transfigured Night"). The plot is based on several traditional text versions; in some versions Hagar becomes pregnant before her happy ending.

== An actual performance ==
An actual American Ballet Theatre performance, accompanied by brief remarks from Antony Tudor, is available on YouTube.

== Legacy ==
This ballet was documented in Labanotation by the Dance Notation Bureau in 1982.
