= Danny Daniels =

American dancer (1924–2017)

Danny Daniels (October 25, 1924 – July 9, 2017), born Daniel Giagni, Jr., was an USA choreographer, tap dancer, and dance teacher.

Daniels was a featured dancer in several 1940s Broadway musicals, including Billion Dollar Baby, Street Scene, and Kiss Me, Kate. Although he continued performing during the 1950s and after, including a tour with the Agnes de Mille Dance Theatre, Daniels quickly moved into choreography for stage, film, and television. He won a Tony Award and an Astaire Award in 1984 for The Tap Dance Kid and received three more Tony nominations for High Spirits, Walking Happy, and the 1967 revival of Annie Get Your Gun.

Daniels' notable film choreography credits include Pennies from Heaven (1981), Indiana Jones and the Temple of Doom (1984), The Night They Raided Minsky's (1968), and Zelig (1983). He also choreographed the dance sequences and dubbed the tap sound effects for the movie musical Stepping Out (1991) starring Liza Minnelli. For television he worked on The Judy Garland Show (1963), as well as specials featuring performers such as Gene Kelly and Danny Kaye. In 1952, he created the Tap Dance Concerto with composer Morton Gould.

Daniels' students included Christopher Walken.

Daniels died on July 9, 2017, at the age of 92.

== Filmography as performer ==
Year	Title	Role	Notes
1958	Passionate Summer	Boatman	Uncredited
1964	Woman of Straw	Fenton	
1965	Curse of Simba	Simbaza	
1967	Prehistoric Women	Jakara	
1968	Dark of the Sun	General Moses	
1969	The Oblong Box	Witchdoctor	
1970	Carry on Up the Jungle	Nosha Chief	
1986	Thunder Run	Bard	
1987	Retribution	Rasta Doctor	
1987	The Outing	Dr. Theo Bressling	
1994	Naked Gun 33 1/3: The Final Insult	Cabbie #3	
1995	Ace Ventura: When Nature Calls	Wachootoo Witch Doctor	(final film role)
