= James Mitchell (actor) =

American dancer and actor (1920–2010)

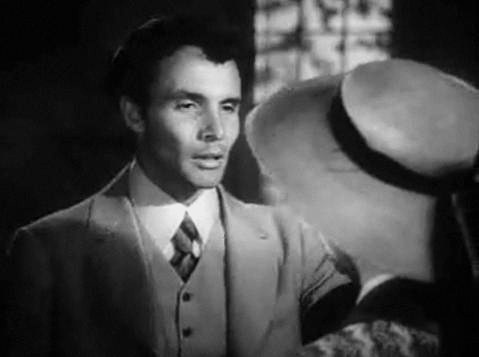
- James Mitchell in Stars in My Crown (1950)
- Born: February 29, 1920; Sacramento, California, U.S.
- Died: January 22, 2010 (aged 89); Los Angeles, California, U.S.
- Other name: Jim Mitchell
- Occupations: Actor; dancer
- Years active: 1940–2010
- Partner: Albert Wolsky (1971–2010; Mitchell's death)

James Mitchell (February 29, 1920 – January 22, 2010) was an American actor and dancer. Although he is best known to television audiences as Palmer Cortlandt on the soap opera All My Children (1979–2010), theatre and dance historians remember him as one of Agnes de Mille's leading dancers. Mitchell's skill at combining dance and acting was considered something of a novelty; in 1959, the critic Olga Maynard singled him out as "an important example of the new dancer-actor-singer in American ballet", pointing to his interpretive abilities and masculine technique.

== Early life ==
Mitchell was born on Leap Day 1920 in Sacramento, California. His parents emigrated from England to Northern California, where they operated a fruit farm in Turlock. In 1923, Mitchell's mother, Edith, left his father and returned to England with Mitchell's brother and sister; she and Mitchell had no further contact. Unable to run a farm while single-handedly raising his remaining son, Mitchell's father fostered him out for several years to vaudevillians Gene and Katherine King.

After Mitchell's mother died, however, his father remarried and brought both of his sons, but not his daughter, back to Turlock. He graduated from Turlock High School. At age seventeen, Mitchell left Turlock for Los Angeles, where he remained close to the Kings.

== Stage and film career ==
While studying drama at Los Angeles City College, Mitchell was introduced to modern dance at the school of the famed teacher and choreographer, Lester Horton. After receiving his associate degree, he joined Horton's company, where he remained for nearly four years. While working with Horton, he became a close friend of dancer Bella Lewitzky; in the 1970s, he became President of the board of directors of her Dance Foundation, and afterwards remained a "major longtime [...] supporter" of hers. In 1944, Horton took Mitchell to New York with him to form a new dance company, but the venture abruptly collapsed.

As it happened, the failure of Horton's company was a significant turning point in Mitchell's career: while struggling to find either acting or dancing roles in New York, he successfully auditioned for Agnes de Mille, who was choreographing her first musical since Oklahoma!. Mitchell, who did not study ballet until he was in his mid-twenties, was at a loss when faced with de Mille's ballet combination. Much later, describing his approach to the audition, he said, "Well, I really hadn't too much familiarity with that but I threw myself across the floor and about the third or fourth pass, Agnes cried 'Stop' and summoned me over and said 'Where on earth did you get your dance training?'". De Mille nevertheless offered him the dual position of principal dancer and assistant choreographer. Given the option between touring with Helen Hayes and dancing for de Mille, he chose de Mille.

Bloomer Girl (1944) began an important artistic partnership with de Mille that lasted from 1944 to 1969 and spanned theater, film, television, and concert dance. De Mille's biographer, Carol Easton, describes him as the "quintessential male de Mille dancer" and de Mille's "closest confidant" in her artistic life. In one of her autobiographical volumes, de Mille herself said of Mitchell that he had "probably the strongest arms in the business, and the adagio style developed by him and his partners has become since a valued addition to ballet vocabulary."

When, nearly thirty years later, an interviewer asked Mitchell to respond to de Mille's comments, he offered a more modest assessment of his career: "I was primarily an actor [...] and I think what Agnes was referring to was my acting and regard for the woman I was partnering. Because in the end I really was a partner. When I look at today's dancers, or I look at the great dance films, such as Seven Brides for Seven Brothers--I couldn't do any of that! I know I was a dancer, but I didn't have the technique. At most I was an actor-dancer."

Mitchell's work with de Mille:

- Bloomer Girl (Broadway, 1944): principal male dancer; assistant choreographer
- Brigadoon (Broadway, 1947): Harry Beaton; assistant choreographer
- Paint Your Wagon (Broadway, 1951): Pete Billings; assistant choreographer
- Come Summer (Broadway, 1969): assistant director
- American Ballet Theatre (1950–51, 1955, 1956): Rodeo (Head Wrangler – ABT premiere cast), Fall River Legend (Pastor), Rib of Eve (Husband – world premiere cast)
- Agnes de Mille Dance Theatre (1953–54): principal dancer
- Royal Winnipeg Ballet (1964): Bitter Weird (Bridegroom)
- Oklahoma! (film, 1955): Dream Curly (excerpted in That's Dancing!)
- Omnibus (TV, 1956): featured dancer, "Art of Ballet"; featured dancer, "Art of Choreography"
- Bloomer Girl (TV, 1956): The Returned Soldier
- Gold Rush (TV, 1958): Miner

Mitchell's other close associations were with Gower Champion, Eugene Loring (with whom he also trained), and Jerome Robbins:

Gower Champion:

- Carnival! (Broadway, 1961; national tour, 1962; West End, 1963): Marco the Magnificent
- Mack & Mabel (Broadway, 1974): William Desmond Taylor
- Annie Get Your Gun (tour, 1977): assistant director

Eugene Loring:

- The Toast of New Orleans (film, 1950): Pierre — "The Tina-Lina" with Rita Moreno
- Deep in My Heart (film, 1954): Specialty dancer — "One Alone" with Cyd Charisse
- Ford Startime: Meet Cyd Charisse (TV, 1959): Partnered Cyd Charisse
- The Perry Como Show (TV, 1963): Partnered Cyd Charisse
- The 38th Academy Awards (TV, 1966): Partnered Cyd Charisse

Jerome Robbins:

- Billion Dollar Baby (Broadway, 1946): Rocky Who Dances
- American Ballet Theatre (1950–51): Facsimile
- American Theatre Laboratory (1967–69): instructor and company member

Mitchell worked consistently on stage in both musicals and straight dramas until the late 1970s, including numerous regional theatre roles across the country. His other significant credits include Broadway appearances in Carousel, First Impressions, and The Deputy; off-Broadway appearances in Winkelberg, The Threepenny Opera, Livin' the Life, and The Father; L'Histoire du Soldat at New York City Opera; and national tours of The Rainmaker (with future All My Children co-star Frances Heflin), The King and I, Funny Girl, and The Threepenny Opera. A character based on Mitchell appears in Anderson Ferrell's biographical dance play, Dance/Speak: The Life of Agnes De Mille, which debuted at New York Theatre Ballet in 2009.

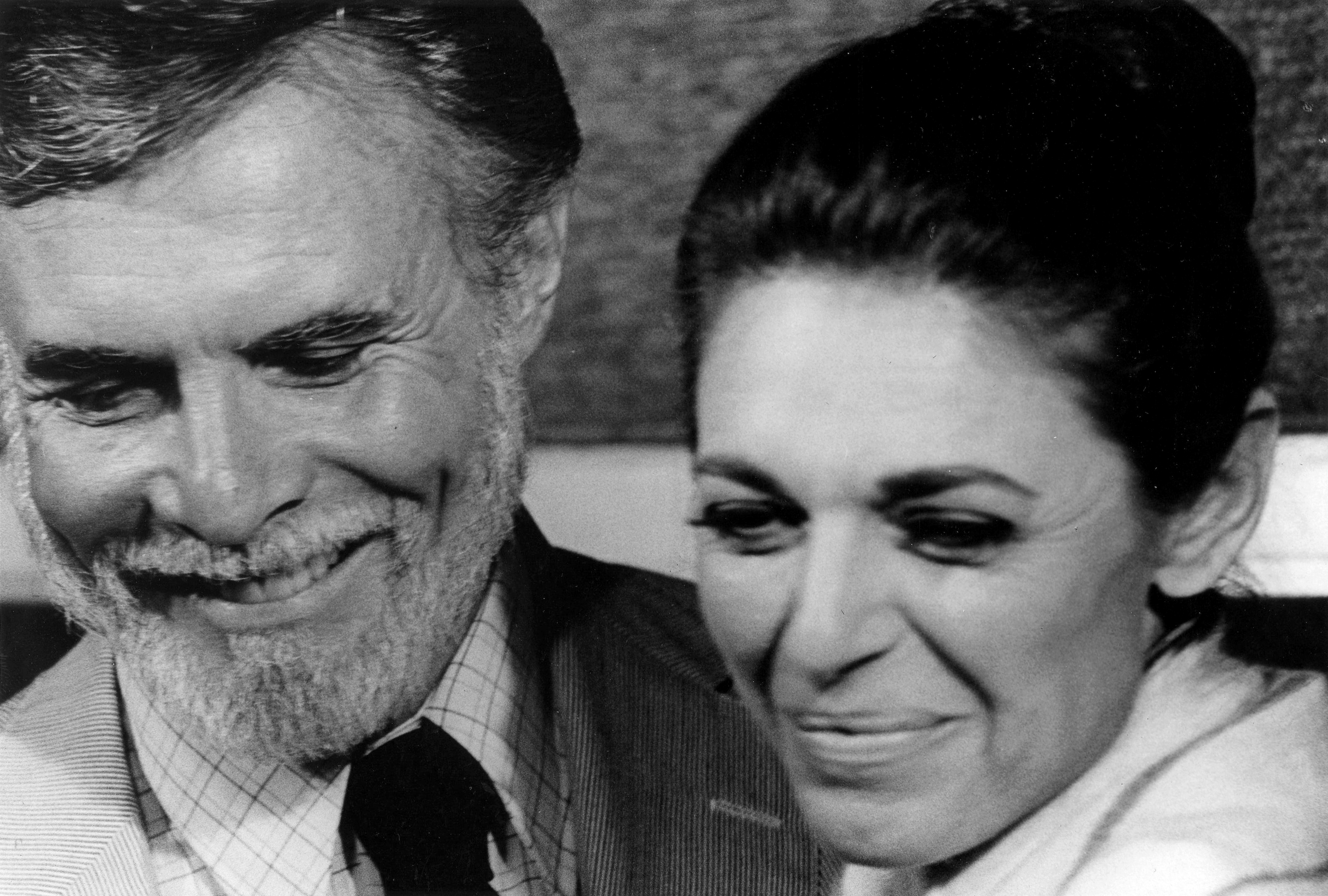
James Mitchell and Anne Bancroft in The Turning Point (1977)

As a film performer, Mitchell had only moderate success. In the early 1940s, he did both chorus dancing and extra work in a number of minor musicals and westerns. In 1949, he starred in The House Across the Street. On the strength of his award-winning performance in Brigadoon, he was scouted by producer Michael Curtiz and signed to a contract at Warner Brothers. Curtiz initially intended to put Mitchell in a picture with Doris Day that never materialized.

After several months, Mitchell eventually made two films for Warner Brothers, including Raoul Walsh's Colorado Territory, before following Curtiz to Metro-Goldwyn-Mayer. At MGM, he played supporting roles in six films between 1949 and 1955, most notably Anthony Mann's Border Incident, Jacques Tourneur's Stars in My Crown, and Vincente Minnelli's critically lauded The Band Wagon (1953), in which he played the unsympathetic role of choreographer Paul Byrd – an experience he loathed so much that he refused to see the film. He did not work for the studio again after appearing in the infamously over-budgeted flop The Prodigal (1955). Mitchell's film career ended abruptly after he starred in Hal R. Makelim's Western The Peacemaker (1956), the only time he was ever billed above the title, as he played the lead, gunfighter Terrall Butler. After that, it took over two decades before he made his next and what proved to be his final appearance on the big screen, The Turning Point (1977). He also co-starred with Thelma "Tad" Tadlock in the famous sponsored film A Touch of Magic presented by General Motors at the 1961 Motorama.

Besides performing, Mitchell occasionally worked as a director and choreographer, particularly in the late 1960s and 1970s. He staged musicals at the Paper Mill Playhouse, the Mark Taper Forum, and The Muny, among other theatres. In 1956, he and Katherine Litz co-staged The Enchanted for American Ballet Theatre.

== Television career ==
On television, Mitchell was considerably more active, especially in the late 1950s and early 1960s. In addition to working regularly as a dancer, he played dramatic roles in a number of television films and prime-time series, as well as in the anthologies that were once so popular, such as Play of the Week, Gruen Guild Playhouse, and Armstrong Circle Theatre. In 1964, he took his first contract role on a soap opera in The Edge of Night, as the corrupt Captain Lloyd Griffin. In 1966, he appeared in an episode of the espionage drama Blue Light. This was followed by a role in the entire run of the soap opera Where the Heart Is (1969–73), in which he played the male lead, Julian Hathaway.

However, after Mack & Mabel flopped in 1974, Mitchell's performing career nearly ended altogether. He earned a BA from Empire State College and an MFA from Goddard College to teach full-time at the college level, and taught movement for actors at Juilliard, Yale University, and Drake University. After a few years of almost no work – although he was a guest star on Lou Grant and Charlie's Angels in the late 1970s, he once summed up the 1970s as "I cried and did a lot of gardening".

He was hired in 1979 as self-made millionaire Palmer Cortlandt alias Pete Cooney on ABC's long-running soap opera All My Children. Initially hired for only one year, he remained on contract through 2009. For much of his first decade on the show, Palmer was a ruthless villain, totally possessive of his daughter Nina and violently threatening his ex-wife Daisy with being attacked by dobermans when she came back from the dead. After the introduction of David Canary in December 1983 as Adam Chandler, Palmer remained ruthless in business dealings, but toned down in romantic relationships. His old ways returned several times, such as when he was revealed to be hoarding stolen artwork and when he tried to kill his last wife, Vanessa, after falsely believing that she had cheated on him. His final appearance as a contract player was September 19, 2008, although his retirement was not made official until September 30, 2009.

== Personal life ==
Mitchell's partner of thirty-nine years was the Oscar-award-winning costume designer Albert Wolsky.

== Death ==
James Mitchell died on January 22, 2010, at age 89, in Los Angeles. He had suffered from chronic obstructive pulmonary disease complicated by pneumonia.

== Awards and nominations ==
- Theatre World Award, 1947: Brigadoon
- Donaldson Award:
  - Best Male Dancer of the Year, 1947: Brigadoon
  - Nominee, Best Male Dancer of the Year, 1946: Billion Dollar Baby (third place)
  - Nominee, Best Male Dancer of the Year, 1951: Paint Your Wagon (second place)
- Honorary Doctorate of Fine Arts, 1985, Drake University
- Daytime Emmy Award nominations, Outstanding Actor, 1980, 1981, 1982, 1983, 1984, 1985, 1989: All My Children
- Soapy Awards: Best Villain 1980 (All My Children)

== See also ==
- All My Children
- Palmer Cortlandt
- American Ballet Theatre
- Gemze de Lappe
- Agnes de Mille
- Lester Horton
- Jerome Robbins
- A Touch of Magic
