= Gemze de Lappe =

American actress

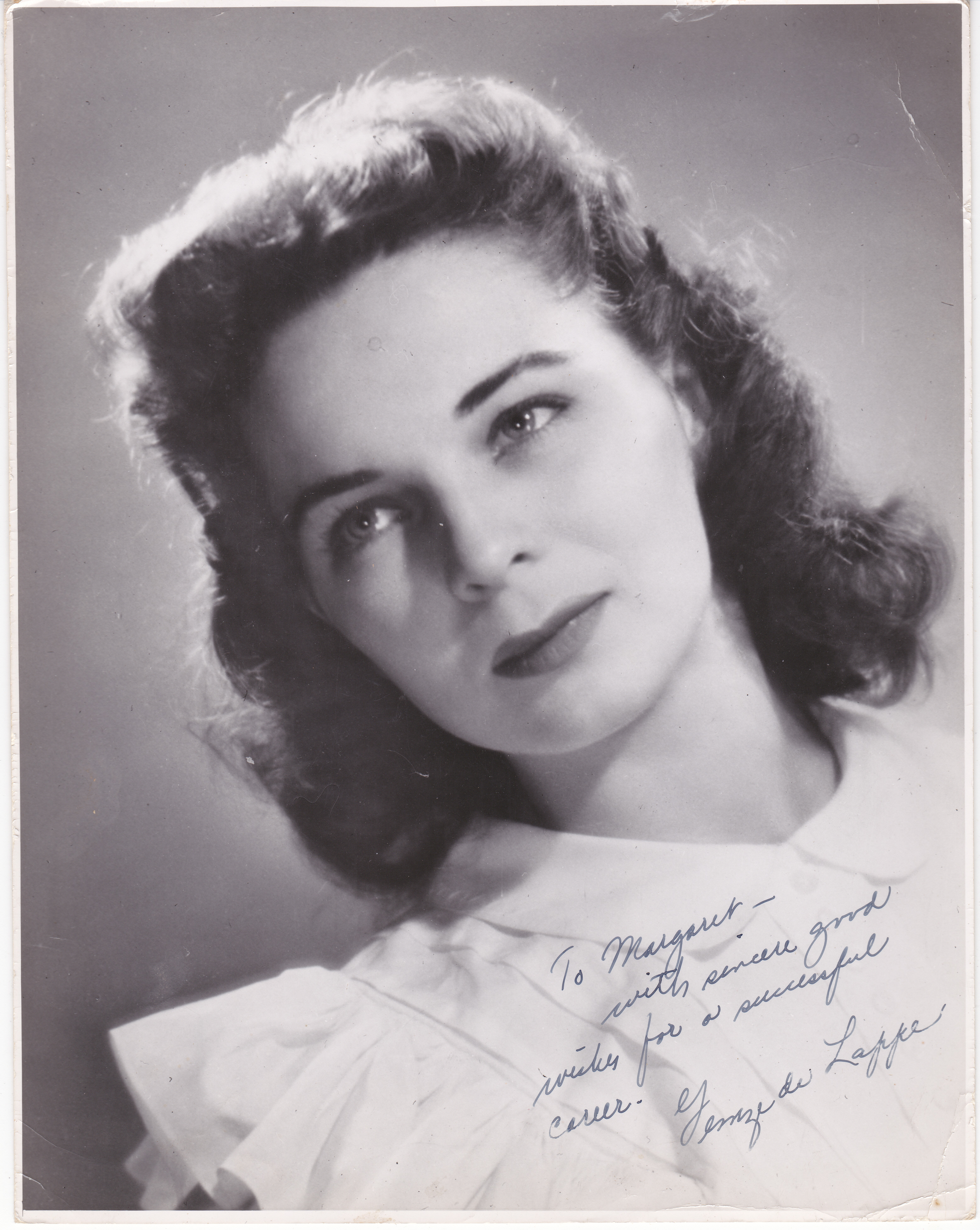
- Signed photo belonging to singer Margaret Ashton
- Born: Gemze Mary de Lappe; February 28, 1922; Portsmouth, Virginia, U.S.
- Died: November 11, 2017 (aged 95); New York City, New York, U.S.
- Known for: Dance and choreography
- Movement: Modern dance
- Spouse(s): John Carisi (m. 1959 or 1960; died 1992)
- Children: 2

Gemze de Lappe (February 28, 1922 – November 11, 2017) was an American dancer who worked very closely with Agnes de Mille and was frequently partnered by de Mille's favorite male dancer, James Mitchell.

Born to Birch Wood de Lappe, an actor and teacher, and his wife, Maureen McDonough, an actress and drummer, Gemze attended Hunter College and the Ballet Arts School at Carnegie Hall. Originally trained by Irma Duncan and Michel Fokine, de Lappe began her career in Fokine's company. Her Broadway musical theatre performance credits include Simon of Legree in the original production of The King and I (also in the film version), Paint Your Wagon (Donaldson Award winner), Juno, and The American Dance Machine. She appeared in the original West End and first national companies of Oklahoma!, dancing the iconic role of Laurey in the "Dream Ballet". In the early 1950s, she briefly formed part of a dance team with Dean Crane. De Lappe's long concert dance career included engagements with American Ballet Theatre and the Agnes de Mille Dance Theatre. For several years, she was a professor of dance at Smith College, and has held a number of visiting appointments since her nominal retirement. In 1989, Niagara University awarded her an honorary doctorate.

She remained active as a choreographer and teacher until her death; she remains known for reconstructing the work of de Mille, Isadora Duncan, and Jerome Robbins. She recreated de Mille's choreography for the 1979 Broadway revival of Oklahoma! and choreographed Abe Lincoln in Illinois on Broadway. She regularly traveled the country, recreating the original choreography for such shows as The King and I, Oklahoma!, Brigadoon, and Carousel for various professional, regional, and educational theatre companies. In Spring 2011, the University of North Carolina School of the Arts presented a faithful recreation of the original Broadway production of Oklahoma! with the original choreography recreated by De Lappe.

In 2007, she was awarded Tony Honors for Excellence in Theatre. In 2012, she received the Martha Hill Dance Fund Lifetime Achievement Award. she died in 2017 at age 95
