= Cresta Blanca Carnival =

American radio variety series (1942–1944)

Cresta Blanca Carnival is an American variety radio program that began on October 14, 1942, and ended on May 30, 1944, first on Mutual and then on CBS.

== Overview ==
=== Mutual version ===
Jack Pearl was the star, with Cliff Hall as his straight man. Jean Merrill and Brad Reynolds were the singers, and Morton Gould led the orchestra. Frank Gallop was the announcer. The orchestra initially had 38 members. Pearl returned to his original specialty of comedy for the show after having devoted his efforts to dramatic acting. With World War II under way, Pearl said, "All of us not serving at the front who can bring a little laughter into people's lives should do so now." Pearl revived hs Baron Munchausen character for the show. It was heard on Wednesdays from 9:15 to 10 p.m. Eastern Time. The last episode on Mutual was broadcast on April 7, 1943.

Pearl left the program "after a 13-week series of disappointments". The trade publication Broadcasting said that "reported disagreements" between Pearl and the sponsor led to the departure of Pearl and Hall.

The January 13, 1943, episode varied from the usual format. In Pearl's absence, George S. Kaufman and Oscar Levant were the hosts. The show featured a drama by Norman Corwin, "2043 — 100 Years Hence", which depicted a world "free of fascism and men who live by the sword." Also heard was the world premiere of "World Anthem", a Corwin-Gould composition dedicated to the United Nations, along with a performance of "Rhapsody in Blue" featuring Levant and Benny Goodman.

=== CBS version ===
Cresta Blanca Carnival moved to CBS beginning with the April 14, 1943, episode. That change was made possible after CBS ended its policy of not advertising alcoholic beverages. The orchestra had grown to 50 musicians, and the format had changed to feature "prominent guests from the concert and popular music fields" each week. Connee Boswell and W. C. Handy appeared on that first CBS episode. Other guests who appeared on the CBS version of the show included Lauritz Melchior, Georgia Gibbs, Rise Stevens, and the Deep River Boys. Pianist Alec Templeton became a permanent member of the show effective September 1, 1943. The CBS version began on Wednesdays at 10:30 p.m. E. T.; in May 1944 it was moved to Tuesdays at 9:30 p.m. E. T.

== Production ==
Producers of Cresta Blanca Carnival included Arthur J. Daly and Frank Chase. Cresta Blanca Wines sponsored the program. Radio historian John Dunning called the commercials "memorable", writing that they "began with a cascade of music, indicating a verbal pouring of wine. Then, in a catchy jingle out of an echo chamber, with each letter punctuated by a plunking violin: C-R-E-S-T-A-B-L-A-N-C-A ... Cresta Blanca!" The show originated from the New Amsterdam Theater in New York.

== Critical response ==
A review of the premiere episode in the trade publication Billboard said that Cresta Blanca Carnival "combines Pearl's top comedy with a musical set-up that could take top honors in its own right." The review described Gould's work with the orchestra as "magnificent" and said that Reynolds and Merrill created "a concert flavor" with their singing.
