= Victor Wesley =

Victor Wesley (born 1948 in Glasgow) is a Scottish-born American dancer. He is a three-time Highland Dance World Champion, winning at the Cowal Highland Gathering in Dunoon, Scotland, in 1968, 1969, and 1972.

He studied under James Jamieson at the Academy of the Dance on 14th Street in Wilmington, Delaware, which was co-founded in 1956 by Helene Antonova & James Jamieson. He eventually became Director of the academy. For many years he produced and directed the academy's celebrated annual productions of Tschaikovsky's "The Nutcracker Ballet" at Wilmington's Dupont Theater (formerly the Playhouse). Audiences especially enjoyed Wesley's comedic talent showcased in his portrayal of Grandmother in these performances.

In February 2008, due to illness, Wesley retired from teaching, closed the academy's original location, and returned to Scotland.
