= Billion Dollar Baby =

- Music: Morton Gould
- Lyrics: Betty Comden; Adolph Green
- Book: Betty Comden; Adolph Green
- Productions: 1945 Broadway

Billion Dollar Baby is a musical with the book and lyrics by Betty Comden and Adolph Green and the score by Morton Gould. Comden and Green were fresh from their success with On the Town, and the production team was something of an On the Town reunion: once again, George Abbott directed and Jerome Robbins choreographed.

The musical is set on Staten Island and in Atlantic City during the late 1920s. It follows the adventures of an ambitious young woman, Maribelle Jones, in her quest for wealth during the Prohibition era.

== Production ==
The musical opened on Broadway at the Alvin Theatre on December 21, 1945, and ran for 220 performances. Billion Dollar Baby was not well received, although Robbins' choreography—which included two dream ballets, a Charleston, and a gangster's funeral procession—was widely praised. (Decades later, Robbins incorporated the Charleston number into Jerome Robbins' Broadway.) The cast starred Joan McCracken (as Maribelle), Mitzi Green, William Tabbert, and David Burns. Early in the run, McCracken was replaced by Virginia Gorski (later Virginia Gibson). Other dancers in the cast included Danny Daniels, Helen Gallagher, and James Mitchell; Mitchell was Tabbert's dance double. The musical director was Max Goberman.

There is no original cast recording, although there is a recording of the 1998 York Theatre Company Mufti Series staged concert version with Kristin Chenoweth, Debbie Gravitte, Marc Kudisch, and Richard B. Shull.

The show gained notoriety for an event that happened in rehearsals: Robbins, walking backwards as he addressed the dancers, failed to realize how close he was to the orchestra pit—and fell into it.

== Songs ==
Act I

- Million Dollar Smile (Billion Dollar Baby)
- Who's Gonna Be the Winner
- Dreams Come True
- Charleston
- Broadway Blossom
- Speaking of Pals
- There I'd Be
- One Track Mind sung and danced by Shirley Van
- Bad Timing
- The Marathoners
- A Lovely Girl

Act II

- Funeral Procession
- Havin' a Time
- The Marathon Dance Faithless
- I'm Sure of Your Love
- A Life With Rocky
- The Wedding
