= Carolina University of Theology =

Christian university in Manassas, Virginia

Coordinates: 38.63505°N 77.43982°W

- Type: Private
- Established: 1990/1991
- Affiliations: Reconciliation Community Church, Manassas, VA, USA.
- President: John R. Peyton
- Location: Manassas, Virginia, USA

Carolina University of Theology or CUT was a private Christian university located in Manassas, Virginia, United States, and offered theological degrees by in-person classes and distance learning. It is an affiliate and educational outreach ministry of 'Reconciliation Community Church' of the same locality.

== Mission statement ==
The mission of Carolina University of Theology is to provide continued educational programs to students who fall into two categories: (1) Those are unable to attend full-time classes on campus. This can be accomplished through the University's home study/online programs. (2) Those who are able to attend on campus classes twice a week.

== History ==
Carolina University of Theology was founded by Dr. Gene Thompson of Iron Station, North Carolina in 1990−91. The university suspended all activities on April 25, 2022 citing lack of students and faculty members.

== Accreditation ==
Carolina University of Theology, In pursuant to 8 VAC 40-31-50 of the Virginia Administrative Code was granted religious exemption from the Commonwealth of Virginia State Council of Higher Education For Virginia/SCHEV's regulations and is authorized as a degree granting institution. Carolina University is unaccredited by CHEA or the USDE.

== Notable alumni ==
- Mel Tomlinson
