= I'm Old Fashioned (ballet) =

Ballet

I'm Old Fashioned (The Astaire Variations) is a ballet made by New York City Ballet balletmaster Jerome Robbins to Morton Gould's adaptation of a theme by Jerome Kern, “I'm Old Fashioned”, to a Fred Astaire and Rita Hayworth sequence from the film You Were Never Lovelier. The premiere took place on Thursday, June 16, 1983, at New York State Theater, Lincoln Center. It was titled Variations on "I'm Old Fashioned" at its first performance, (Note: NY Times by Anna Kisselgoff, June 18, 1983) but the name was truncated to its current form the following week. (Note: NY Times by Anna Kisselgoff, June 28, 1983)

== Original cast ==
- Judith Fugate
- Kyra Nichols
- Heather Watts
- Joseph Duell
- Sean Lavery
- Bart Cook

== Reviews ==
- NY Times by Alastair Macaulay, October 9, 2010

== Articles ==
- Sunday NY Times, Jack Anderson, May 29, 1983
- NY Times, Roslyn Sulcas, May 28, 2007
