= Loren Hightower =

- Born: December 2, 1927; Ochiltree County, Texas, USA
- Died: November 7, 2017 (aged 89); Myrtle Beach, South Carolina
- Other names: "Tex"
- Occupations: ballet dancer, choreographer

Loren (Tex) Hightower (December 2, 1927 – November 7, 2017) was an American dancer who split his performing career between ballet and musical theatre. He was no relation to ballerina Rosella Hightower.

Originally from Belton, Texas, Hightower trained with Ted Shawn. He danced principal roles with the Metropolitan Ballet, American Ballet Theatre, and the Agnes de Mille Dance Theatre; in addition, he performed regularly at the Metropolitan Opera. Like many ballet dancers of the 1940s and 1950s, Hightower frequently supplemented his income by working in musical theatre, and his Broadway appearances include Peter Pan, 110 in the Shade, Camelot, Anyone Can Whistle, and Brigadoon. He retired from performing in the late 1960s.

Hightower's credits as a choreographer include the ballets The Maids, An Idyll for Aphrodite, and Chips from a Crystal Ballroom, as well as Museum for the New York Shakespeare Festival.

For many years, Hightower taught dance at Adelphi University.
