= Stringmusic =

- by Morton Gould
- Form: Suite
- Commissioned by: National Symphony Orchestra
- Performed: 10 March 1994: Kennedy Center
- Published: 1993: G. Schirmer, Inc.

Stringmusic is a musical composition for string orchestra by the American composer Morton Gould. It was commissioned by the National Symphony Orchestra and was premiered at the Kennedy Center by the NSO on March 10, 1994. The piece is dedicated to the conductor Mstislav Rostropovich upon his leave.

Unanimously recommended by the jury, Stringmusic was awarded the Pulitzer Prize for Music in 1995.

"A large-scale suite, or serenade, for string orchestra, comprising five movements[:]" "Prelude", "Tango", "Dirge", "Ballad", "Strum".
