= Paint Your Wagon (musical) =

- Original Cast Recording Cover
- Music: Frederick Loewe
- Lyrics: Alan J. Lerner
- Book: Alan J. Lerner
- Productions: 1951 Broadway; 1953 West End; 2015 Encores!

Paint Your Wagon is a Broadway musical comedy, with book and lyrics by Alan J. Lerner and music by Frederick Loewe. The story centers on a miner and his daughter and follows the lives and loves of the people in a mining camp in Gold Rush-era California. Popular songs from the show included "Wand'rin' Star", "I Talk to the Trees", and "They Call the Wind Maria".

The musical ran on Broadway in 1951 and in the West End in 1953. In 1969, the film version, also titled Paint Your Wagon, was released. It had a highly revised plot and some new songs composed by Lerner and André Previn.

== Synopsis ==
Act I

In the California Wilderness in May 1853, a crusty old miner, Ben Rumson, is conducting a makeshift funeral for a friend. Meanwhile, his 16-year-old daughter Jennifer discovers gold dust. Ben claims the land, and prospectors start flocking to the brand new town of Rumson ("I'm On My Way"). Two months later Rumson has a population of 400, all of whom are men except for Jennifer. Prospector Jake Whippany is waiting to save enough money to send for Cherry and her Fandango girls ("Rumson"), while Jennifer senses the tension building in town ("What's Going On Here?"). Julio Valveras, a handsome young miner forced to live and work outside of town because he is Mexican, comes to town with dirty laundry and runs into Jennifer, who volunteers to do his laundry. They also talk to each other ("I Talk to the Trees"). Steve Bulmarck and the other men ponder the lonely nomadic life they lead in the song "They Call the Wind Maria".

Two months later the men want Ben to send Jennifer away, and he wishes her mother was still alive to help him ("I Still See Elisa"). Jennifer is in love with Julio ("How Can I Wait?"), and when Ben sees Jennifer dancing with Julio's clothes, he decides to send her East on the next stage. Jacob Woodling, a Mormon man with two wives, Sarah and Elizabeth, arrives in Rumson where the men demand Jacob sell one of his wives. To his surprise, Ben finds himself wooing Elizabeth ("In Between") and wins her for $800 ("Whoop-Ti-Yay"). Jennifer is disgusted by her father's actions and runs away, telling Julio that she will be reunited with him in a year's time ("Cariño Mío”). Cherry and her Fandango girls arrive ("There's a Coach Comin' In"). Julio learns his claim is running dry which means he has to move on to make a living and that he will not be there to greet Jennifer when she returns.

Act II

A year later in October, the miners celebrate the high times in Rumson now that the Fandango girls are around ("Hand Me Down That Can o' Beans"). Edgar Crocker, a miner who has saved his money, falls for Elizabeth and she responds, although Ben is distracted by the fact Raymond Janney is in love with her and does not notice. Another miner, Mike Mooney, tells Julio about a lake that has gold dust on the bottom and he considers looking for it ("Another Autumn"). Jennifer returns in December, having learned civilized ways back East ("All for Him"). Ben tells his daughter that he will soon be moving on since he was not meant to stay in one place for long ("Wand'rin' Star"). The next day as Cherry and the girls are packing to leave they tell her about Julio leaving to find the lake with a bottom of gold. Raymond Janney offers to buy Elizabeth from Ben for $3,000, but she runs off with Edgar Crocker.

Word comes of another strike 40 miles south of Rumson and the rest of the town packs up to leave except for Jennifer, who is waiting for Julio to return, and Ben, who suddenly realizes that Rumson is indeed his town. Late in April, Julio appears, a broken man. Ben welcomes him and Julio is amazed to see Jennifer is there. As they move toward each other, the wagons filled with people move on.

== Songs ==
Act 1

- I'm On My Way - Steve Bullnack, Jake Whippany, Mike Mooney, Lee Zen, Sing Yuy, Sandy Twist, Edgar Crocker, Reuben Sloane and Miners
- Rumson - Jake
- What's Goin' On Here? - Jennifer Rumson
- I Talk to the Trees - Julio Valveras and Jennifer
- "They Call the Wind Maria" - Steve, Miners and Dancer
- I Still See Elisa - Ben Rumson
- How Can I Wait? - Jennifer
- Trio - Elizabeth Woodling, Sarah Woodling and Jacob Woodling
- Rumson (Reprise) - Jake
- In Between - Ben
- Whoop-Ti-Ay! - Ben, Elizabeth and Miners
- How Can I Wait? (Reprise) - Jennifer and Julio

Act 2

- Hand Me Down That Can O'Beans - Jake and Miners
- Rope Dance - Fandangos, Pete Billings and Singer
- Can-can - Suzanne Duval, Rocky, Fandangos and Miners
- Another Autumn - Julio Valveras, Dancer and Pete Billings
- Movin' - Miners
- I'm On My Way (Reprise) - Miners
- All For Him - Jennifer
- Wand'rin' Star - Ben
- I Talk to the Trees (Reprise) - Jennifer
- Strike! - Steve, Jasper and Jake
- (I Was Born Under a) Wand'rin' Star (Reprise) - Jake, Steve, Sandy and Miners

== Productions ==
The musical had a pre-Broadway try-out at the Shubert Theater in Philadelphia opening on September 17, 1951. It opened on Broadway at the Shubert Theatre on November 12, 1951, and closed on July 19, 1952, after 289 performances. The production was directed by Daniel Mann, set design by Oliver Smith, costume design by Motley, lighting design by Peggy Clark, music for dances arranged by Trude Rittmann, with dances and musical ensembles by Agnes de Mille set to the orchestrations of Ted Royal.

It starred James Barton (as Ben Rumson), Olga San Juan (Jennifer Rumson), Tony Bavaar (Julio Valveras), Gemze de Lappe (Yvonne Sorel), James Mitchell (Pete Billings), Kay Medford (Cherry), and Marijane Maricle (Elizabeth Woodling). Burl Ives and Eddie Dowling later took over the role of Ben Rumson, and Ann Crowley was a replacement for Jennifer. De Mille later restaged the dances as a stand-alone ballet, Gold Rush.

The West End production opened on February 11, 1953 at Her Majesty's Theatre and ran for 477 performances. It starred real life father and daughter Bobby Howes and Sally Ann Howes. The Australian production opened on November 27, 1954 at Her Majesty's Theatre in Melbourne, with Alec Kellaway as Ben.

A new production, with a revised libretto by David Rambo, was premiered at the Brentwood Theatre, produced by the Geffen Playhouse in association with Christopher Allen, D. Constantine Conte, and Larry Spellman in Los Angeles, California, from November 23, 2004, to January 9, 2005. This new world premiere adaptation was directed by Gilbert Cates and choreographed by Kay Cole. Design team included musical director Steve Orich, who provided arrangements and orchestrations. The design team featured Daniel Ionazzi (scenic and lighting), David Kay Mickeleson (costume) and Phil Allen (sound). The cast included Thomas F. Wilson as Ben Rumson, Jessica Rush as his daughter Jennifer and Sharon Lawrence as Lily. One change from the original was "They Call the Wind Maria" staged as an ensemble number instead of a showcase solo.

A subsequent production was produced by the Pioneer Theatre Company in Salt Lake City, Utah and ran from September 28, 2007, through October 13, 2007. The director was Charles Morey and choreographer Patti D'Beck, with a cast of nearly 30.

The musical was presented in an Encores! staged concert production at New York City Center in March 2015. The production was directed by Marc Bruni, and starred Keith Carradine as Ben Rumson, Alexandra Socha as Jennifer and Justin Guarini as Julio Valveras.

== Reception ==
The New York Times was highly complimentary:

Frederick Loewe’s score…is superb. Developing the theme of life in a gold-mining town of 1853, Mr. Loewe has composed a whole album of roaring ballads and romantic melodies that are tonic and original, and the most accomplished music Broadway has fallen heir to since ‘The King and I’ and ‘Guys and Dolls’….Agnes de Mille has composed and directed some of her most pungent ballets. She has an extraordinary enthusiasm for period ballet, but since she has a sense of humor she is not pedantic about it. Without impairing her taste, she retains the common touch: she enjoys the ancient games of flirtation, courtship and carnival….As a whole ‘Paint Your Wagon’ is so heartily enjoyable that a job of loosening and shortening the second act might still be worth attempting. But that could hardly improve the performance of one of the most likable casts recently assembled to entertain a Broadway congregation. James Barton is the greatest of the performers….he gives one of those humorous, relaxed, lovable and masterful performances that are peculiar to actors with a long and varied experience. Without strutting or hamming, he owns the stage.

In 2010, Steven Suskin wrote, "The interwoven use of ballet that worked so well in the highlands was less effective on the prairies, and the subject matter was harsh and cold. In spite of the show's failure, Loewe displayed ... an uncanny ability to write scores indigenous to the time and locale of the characters and plots."

== Awards and nominations ==
- Theatre World Award

Tony Bavaar (winner)
