= Morton Gould =

American composer and pianist (1913–1996)

Morton Gould

Morton Gould (December 10, 1913 – February 21, 1996) was an American composer, conductor, arranger, and pianist.

== Biography ==
Morton Gould was born in Richmond Hill, New York, United States. He was of Austrian-Jewish heritage. He was recognized early as a child prodigy with abilities in improvisation and composition. His first composition was published at age six. Gould studied at the Institute of Musical Art in New York. His most important teachers were Abby Whiteside and Vincent Jones. Gould was a member of Phi Mu Alpha Sinfonia.

During the Depression, Gould, while a teenager, worked in New York City playing piano in movie theaters, as well as with vaudeville acts. When Radio City Music Hall opened in December 1932, 19 year old Gould was hired as the staff pianist. By 1935, he was conducting and arranging orchestral programs for New York's WOR radio station, where he reached a national audience via the Mutual Broadcasting System, combining popular programming with classical music.

Gould led the orchestra for The Jack Pearl Show, which was broadcast on NBC in the 1930s. In the 1940s, Gould appeared on the Cresta Blanca Carnival radio program, Keep 'Em Rolling, and Major Bowes' Shower of Stars, as well as The Chrysler Hour on CBS, where he reached an audience of millions. In 1942, he composed music for the short film Ring of Steel, directed by Garson Kanin and produced by the Film Unit of the U.S. Office for Emergency Management. In 1943, he was hired by the William H. Weintraub advertising agency as its musical director, believed to be the first position of its kind in the advertising field.

In 1936, Gould married Shirley Uzin, and lived in apartment with her and her sister on Austin Street in Forest Hills, Queens. The marriage ended in divorce in 1943, and Gould moved into an apartment on nearby 78th Avenue with his brother, Walter Gould, adjacent to Flushing Meadows-Corona Park. In the following year, Gould married Shirley Bank. This marriage, too, ended in divorce.

Gould had four children with Shirley Bank. On February 16, 1945, their son Eric was born. Their second son David was born on March 2, 1947. Their first daughter, Abby, was born on February 3, 1950, and, on December 21, 1954, their second daughter Deborah was born.

Gould refused to appear before the House Un-American Activities Committee, even when offered recording contracts and Broadway musicals in exchange for his testimony. His refusal meant he went from the Committee’s “ask” list to the Committee's blacklist.

Gould composed Broadway scores such as Billion Dollar Baby and Arms and the Girl; film music such as Delightfully Dangerous, Cinerama Holiday, and Windjammer; music for television series such as World War One and the miniseries Holocaust; and ballet scores including Interplay, Fall River Legend, and I'm Old Fashioned.

Gould's music was commissioned by symphony orchestras all over the United States and was also commissioned by the Library of Congress, The Chamber Music Society of Lincoln Center, the American Ballet Theatre, and the New York City Ballet. His ability to seamlessly combine multiple musical genres into formal classical structure, while maintaining their distinctive elements, was unsurpassed, and Gould received three commissions for the United States Bicentennial.

As a conductor, Gould led all of the major American orchestras as well as those of Canada, Mexico, Europe, Japan, and Australia. With his own orchestra, he recorded many classical standards, including Gershwin's Rhapsody in Blue, on which he also played the piano. Gould arranged and conducted instrumental music from many genres (classical, light classics, "pops", Broadway, jazz standards, and Latin American) on dozens of LP record albums for major record labels (often RCA Victor), usually credited to Morton Gould and his Orchestra. He won a Grammy Award in 1966 for his recording of Charles Ives' first symphony, with the Chicago Symphony Orchestra. In 1983, Gould received the American Symphony Orchestra League's Gold Baton Award. In 1986 he was elected to the American Academy and Institute of Arts and Letters.

For many decades Gould was an active member of ASCAP (American Society of Composers, Authors and Publishers). He sat on its board from 1959 and served as president from 1986 until 1994. During his tenure, he lobbied for the intellectual rights of performing artists as the internet was becoming a force that would greatly affect ASCAP's members.

Incorporating new styles into his repertoire as they emerged, Gould incorporated wildly disparate elements, including a rapping narrator in a work titled "The Jogger and the Dinosaur," American tap dancing in his "Tap Dance Concerto" for dancer and orchestra, and a singing fire department titled "Hosedown"—commissioned works for the Pittsburgh Youth Symphony. In 1993, his work "Ghost Waltzes" was commissioned for the ninth Van Cliburn International Piano Competition. In the same year, he received the El Premio Billboard for his contributions to Latin music in the United States. In 1994, Gould received the Kennedy Center Honor in recognition of lifetime contributions to American culture.

In 1995, Gould was awarded the Pulitzer Prize for Music for Stringmusic, a composition commissioned by the National Symphony Orchestra in recognition of the final season of director Mstislav Rostropovich. In 2005, he was honored with the Grammy Lifetime Achievement Award. He also was a member of the board of the American Symphony Orchestra League and of the National Endowment for the Arts music panel. Gould's original manuscripts, personal papers and other pertinent pieces are archived in the Library of Congress and available to the public.

Gould died on February 21, 1996, in Orlando, Florida, where he was the first resident guest composer/conductor at the Disney Institute and was in the middle of a three-day tribute honoring his music. He was 82 years old.

== Work on Broadway ==
- Interplay (1945), ballet to the choreography of Jerome Robbins - composer
- Billion Dollar Baby (1945), musical - composer and orchestrator
- Arms and the Girl (1950), musical - composer and orchestrator
- Jerome Robbins' Broadway (1989), revue - featured songwriter for "Billion Dollar Baby"

== Work in film and television ==
- Delightfully Dangerous (1945), composer and actor
- Casey, Crime Photographer (1951–1952), composer and music
- Cinerama Holiday (1955), composer, additional music by Jack Shaindlin and Nathan Van Cleave
- Windjammer (1958), composer, orchestra conducted by Jack Shaindlin
- In Search of the Castaways (1962), composer, additional music by Van Cleave
- World War One (CBS - 1964), composer, CBS Symphony Orchestra conducted by Alfredo Antonini.

== Works ==
- Abby Variations (piano) (1964)
- A Capella (1987)
- Adeste Fidelis
- American Ballads, Settings of American Tunes for Orchestra (1976)
- American Caprice
- American Salute (1942)
- American Sing: Settings of Folk Songs (1984)
- American Symphonette no 2 (1939)
- American Youth March
- Americana
- The Anniversary Rag (piano) (1994)
- Apple Waltzes (In Tribute to George Balanchine) (7 movements from Audubon) (1969)
- At the Piano (1964)
- Audubon (Birds of America) (1969)
- Ballad for Band (1946)
- Battle Hymn (1950)
- Benny's Gig (1962)
- Big City Blues (1950)
- Boogie Woogie Etude (for piano and orchestra) (1943)
- Buckaroo Blues (1954)
- Burchfield Gallery (1978–1979)
- Café Rio (1957)
- Calypso Souvenir (1964)
- Celebration Strut for Orchestra (1981)
- 'Cellos (1984)
- Centennial Symphony, Gala for Band (1983)
- Cheers! — A Celebration March (1979)
- Christmas Time (1992)
- Cinerama Holiday: Suite (1955)
- Classical Variations on Colonial Themes (1984)
- Columbia: Broadsides for Orchestra (1967)
- Come Up From the Valley, Children (1964)
- Concertette for Viola and Band (1943)
- Concerto Concertante (for violin and orchestra) (1981–1982)
- Concerto for Flute (1984)
- Concerto for Orchestra (1944)
- Concerto for Piano (1938)
- Concerto for Viola (1943)
- Cowboy Rhapsody (1943)
- Dance Gallery
- Dance Variations for Two Pianos & Orchestra (1953)
- Dancing Days (1966)
- Declaration: Suite (1956)
- Derivations for Solo Clarinet and Band (1955)
- Deserted Ballroom (1936)
- Dialogues (for piano and orchestra) (1958)
- Diversions: for Tenor Saxophone and Orchestra (1990)
- Dixie (1949)
- Dramatic Fanfares from CBS-TV documentary “World War I” (orchestra) (1964)
- Duo for Flute and Clarinet (1982)
- Fall River Legend (1947)
- Family Album: Suite (1951)
- Fanfare for Freedom (1942)
- Festive Fanfare (1991)
- Festive Music (1964)
- Flares and Declamations (1987)
- Flourishes and Galop (1983)
- Folk Suite (1941)
- Formations (1964)
- Foster Gallery (1939)
- Ghost Waltzes (piano) (1991)
- Global Greetings for Symphonic Band (1994)
- Guajira (for clarinet and orchestra) (1949)
- Hail to a First Lady (1991)
- Hamma'ariv aravim (1947)
- Harvest (1945)
- Holiday Music (1947)
- Holocaust: Suite (from the NBC-TV series) (1978)
- Home for Christmas
- A Homespun Overture (1939)
- Hoofer Suite (for Tap Dancer and Orchestra) (1956)
- Hosedown: A Firefighter Fable (1995)
- Housewarming (1982)
- I'm Old Fashioned, The Astaire Variations (1983)
- In Search of the Castaways Suite (from the Walt Disney film) (1962)
- Interplay (American Concertette) (for piano and orchestra) (1945)
- Inventions (for Four Pianos and Orchestra)(1953)
- It's A Living
- Jeeps and Peeps (1944)
- Jekyll and Hyde Variations (1956)
- Jericho
- Jingle Bells (1952)
- The Jogger and the Dinosaur (for rapper and orchestra) (1992)
- Latin-American Symphonette (Symphonette No. 4) (1940)
- Lincoln Legend (1942)
- Main Street March
- Main Street Waltz
- March of The Leathernecks (1946 first performed)
- Mini-Suite for Band (1968)
- Minstrel Show (1946)
- Minute-Plus Waltz/Rag (1990)
- New China March
- No Longer Very Clear (for baritone or mezzo-soprano and piano) (1994)
- Notes of Remembrance (1989)
- Of Time and the River (1945)
- Parade (for Percussion) (1956)
- Patterns (piano) (1984)
- Philharmonic Waltzes (1948)
- Pieces of China (piano) (1985)
- Prelude and Toccata (piano) (1945)
- Prisms (1962)
- Quotations (1983)
- Rag Waltz (piano) (1984)
- Recovery Music (for Clarinet) (1984)
- Red Cavalry March
- Rhythm Gallery (1959)
- Saint Lawrence Suite for Band (1958)
- Salutations (1966)
- Santa Fé Saga (1956)
- Serenade of Carols (1949)
- Show Piece for Orchestra (1954)
- Something To Do—Labor Cantata (1976)
- Sonata No. 1 (piano) (1930)
- Sonata No. 2 (piano) (1932)
- Sonata No. 3 (piano) (1936)
- A Song of Freedom (1941)
- Soundings (1969)
- Spirituals for String Choir and Orchestra (1941)
- Spirituals for String Orchestra and Harp (1959)
- StringMusic (1995)
- Suite (for Cello and Piano) (1981)
- Suite (for Violin and Piano) (1945)
- Symphonette No. 3 (Third American Symphonette)
- Symphonette No. 4 (Latin-American Symphonette) (1933)
- Symphonic Serenade (1956)
- Symphony No. 1 (1943)
- Symphony No. 2 "Symphony on Marching Tunes" (1944)
- Symphony No. 3 (1946)
- Symphony No. 4 "West Point" (1952)
- Symphony of Spirituals (1975)
- Tap Dance Concerto (1952)
- Ten for Deborah (piano) (1965)
- There Are (No) Children Here (1996)
- Troubadour Music (1969)
- Tuba Suite (1971)
- Two for Chorus (1966)
- Two Pianos (1987)
- Venice for Double Orchestra and Brass Choirs (1967)
- Vivaldi Gallery for String Quartet and Divided Orchestra (1968)
- Windjammer (1958)
- World War I: Selections (Music for the CBS-TV series) (1964)
- Yankee Doodle (1945)

== Studio albums ==
- Morton Gould Showcase and his Orchestra (Columbia Masterworks, 1947)
- Christmas Music for Orchestra (Columbia Records, 1949)
- Wagon Wheels (Columbia Masterworks, 1954)
- Symphonic Serenade (Columbia Records, 1954)
- The Serious Gershwin (RCA Victor, 1955) --start of RCA period
- Jungle Drums (1956)
- Brass and Percussion (1957)
- Blues in the Night (1957)
- Copland: Billy the Kid; Rodeo (1957)
- Kern/Porter Favorites (1958)
- Coffee Time (1958)
- Moon, Wind and Stars (1958)
- Doubling in Brass (1959)
- Beethoven: Wellington's Victory; Grofé: Grand Canyon Suite (1960)
- Moonlight Sonata (1960)
- Carmen for Orchestra (1960)
- Beyond the Blue Horizon (1961)
- Sousa Forever! (1961)
- Love Walked In (1962)
- Good Night Sweetheart (1963)
- Finlandia: Music of Sibelius (1963)
- More Jungle Drums (1964)
- Latin, Lush and Lovely (1964)
- Makes the Scene (1967)
- Morton Gould Twin Pack (1969)
- A Musical Christmas Tree (1969)
