= Fall River Legend =

Ballet

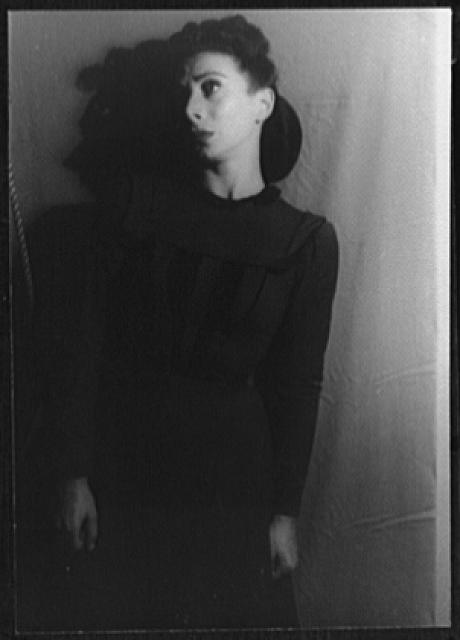
Nora Kaye in Fall River Legend (1948)

Fall River Legend is a ballet by American choreographer Agnes de Mille, with music by Morton Gould. Set in Massachusetts in 1892-1893, the ballet tells the infamous story of Lizzie Borden. The work notably alters the outcome of the court case, with Borden receiving a guilty verdict rather than an acquittal. De Mille herself believed that Borden was guilty of the murder of her father and stepmother. Like the majority of de Mille’s ballets, Fall River Legend is deeply character driven. The ballet was commissioned by American Ballet Theatre and premiered on April 22, 1948 at the Metropolitan Opera House. Today, Fall River Legend is considered by many scholars to be her masterpiece and when it first premiered, the reviews of the ballet were generally positive.

== Conception ==
The playwright Edward Sheldon encouraged de Mille to use the Lizzie Borden story for a dance, following the success of her 1942 ballet Rodeo. However, the creative development of the ballet was stalled by de Mille’s marriage to Walter Prude, the birth of their son Jonathan, and de Mille’s work on Broadway. Still, the idea remained on de Mille’s mind and on her honeymoon she brought a copy of Edmund Pearson’s The Trial of Lizzie Borden.

The score of the ballet was composed by Morton Gould and featured sets by Oliver Smith. De Mille worked closely with Gould to create Fall River Legend and the decision to end the ballet with a guilty verdict was one they came to together. In a later interview between composer and choreographer, they recall that they came to this decision at the famous Russian Tea Room. Gould claimed that he could not write "acquittal music" and thus suggested the alternate ending. He also quipped that "changing history is called poetic license."

To provide context for the narrative, the ballet opens with a “true bill,” delivering the guilty verdict. For de Mille, the legal terminology helped to establish the dramatic mood of the ballet. De Mille describes how this choice, “… would get over the exposition quickly and reveal that our heroine was in a very nasty predicament.” De Mille made the decision not to show any violence on stage throughout the ballet, as she believed that violence on stage was “nearly always silly.” Early in the ballet, a younger version of “The Accused” dances in a dream sequence with her mother, while the adult version of the character looks on. De Mille also added a love story to her ballet, between The Accused and the Pastor. In one affectionate pas de deux, the Pastor and the Accused dance together, with the music echoing that of a previous dance between the Mother and Father characters.

== Productions ==
The original cast of Fall River Legend included:

Diana Adams	"Mother"
Alicia Alonso	"The Accused"
Muriel Bentley	"Stepmother"
Peter Gladke	"Father"
Ruth Ann Koesun	"The Accused as a Child"
John Kriza	"Pastor"

A March 24, 1957 episode of Omnibus presented a production of the ballet with Nora Kaye as "The Accused".

More recent performances of Fall River Legend include a production by the Dance Theatre of Harlem in 1989. This production, commercially available for viewing, features current Dance Theatre of Harlem artistic director Virginia Johnson in the role of “The Accused.” American Ballet Theatre performed the ballet in 1999 and again in 2007, most recently featuring ballerinas Julie Kent and Gillian Murphy as "The Accused".

== See also ==
- List of historical ballet characters
