= Interplay (ballet) =

Interplay is a ballet in one act made by Jerome Robbins, subsequently ballet master of New York City Ballet, for Billy Rose's Concert Varieties to Morton Gould's 1945 American Concertette. The premiere took place on Friday, 1 June 1945 at the Ziegfeld Theatre, New York. It was taken into the repertory of the American Ballet Theatre and presented on Wednesday, 17 October that year with costumes by Irene Sharaff. It has been revived for the City Ballet on Tuesday, 23 December 1952 at City Center of Music and Drama.

== Original cast ==
- Alicia Alonso
- Janet Reed
- John Kriza
- Harold Lang
- Tommy Rall

== Articles ==
- Sam Zolotow, "ROSE VAUDEVILLE ARRIVING TONIGHT; 'Concert-Varieties' to Open at the Ziegfeld--Dunham Dancers, Zero Mostel Featured", NY Times, June 1, 1945
- "INTERPLAY' TO GET JOFFREY PREMIERE", NY Times, September 26, 1972

== Reviews ==
- Lewis Nichols, "THE PLAY; Vaude., as Art", NY Times, June 2, 1945
- John Martin, "NEW ROBBINS WORK AT BALLET THEATRE; Choreographer's 'Interplay' Is Presented for First Time by Troupe at Metropolitan", NY Times, October 18, 1945]
- "Music: Made in U.S.A.", Time magazine, October 29, 1945
- John Martin, "D'AMBOISE DANCES ROLE IN 'INTERPLAY'; Another City Ballet Feature on Week-End Is Jerome Robbins' 1st Appearance of Season", NY Times, May 11, 1953
- Clive Barnes, "Ballet: Poisoned Bubbles in the Soda; Acid Comment Lurks in Robbins's 'Interplay'", NY Times, January 22, 1966
- Clive Barnes, "The Ballet: 'Interplay'", NY Times, October 21, 1973
- "'INTERPLAY' DANCED BRIGHTLY BY CHRYST", NY Times, March 27, 1976
- Anna Kisselgoff, "CITY BALLET: Peter Martin's 'Rossini Quartets'", NY Times, February 14, 1983
- Roslyn Sulcas, "A Feast of Fancies in Three Robbins Works", NY Times, May 29, 2008
- Anna Kisselgoff, "CITY BALLET REVIEW; A Delicate Balance in Love and the World", NY Times, June 4, 2004
- Alastair Macaulay, "For a Good Cause: Bits and Pieces and Company Depth", NY Times, June 30, 2008
