= Joan McCracken =

American dancer and actress (1917–1961)

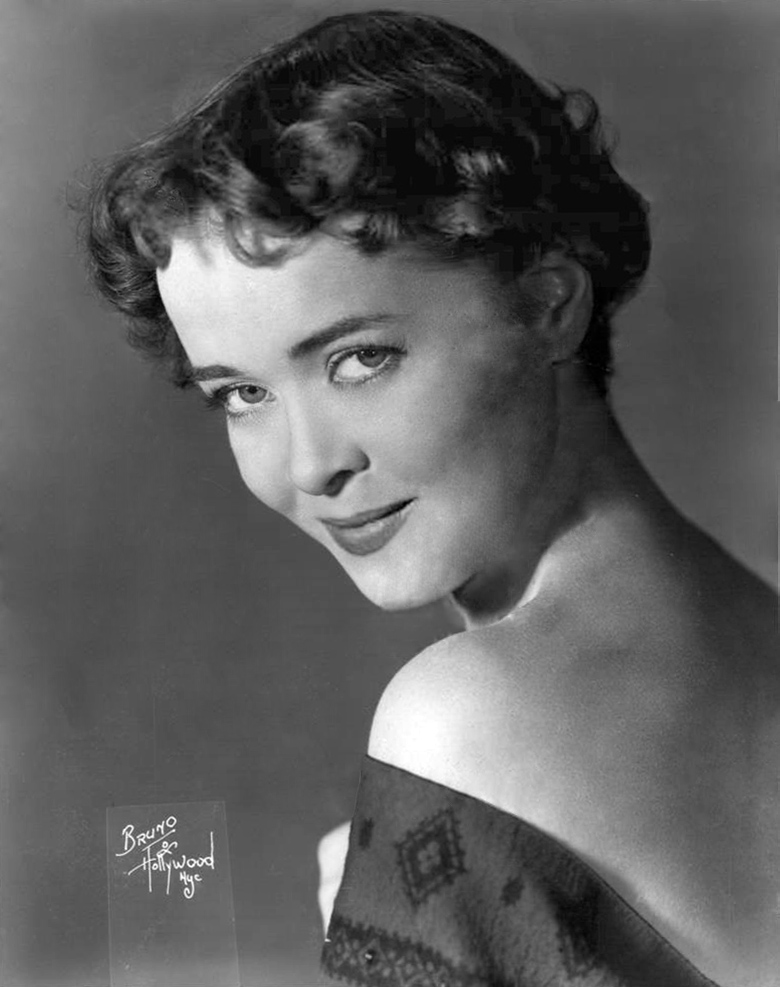
- McCracken in 1950
- Born: Joan Hume McCracken; December 31, 1917; Philadelphia, Pennsylvania, U.S.
- Died: November 1, 1961 (aged 43); New York City, U.S.
- Occupations: Dancer, actress
- Years active: 1935–1958
- Spouses: Jack Dunphy (m. 1939; div. 1948) Bob Fosse (m. 1952; div. 1959)

Joan Hume McCracken (December 31, 1917 – November 1, 1961) was an American dancer and actress who became famous for her role as Sylvie ("The Girl Who Falls Down") in the original 1943 production of Oklahoma! She also was noted for her performances in the Broadway shows Bloomer Girl (1944), Billion Dollar Baby (1945), and Dance Me a Song (1950), and the films Hollywood Canteen (1945) and Good News (1947).

McCracken was a trendsetter in musical comedy dance. In her Oklahoma! role, she became an instant sensation for a carefully choreographed pratfall during the "Many a New Day" dance number. She was considered an innovator in combining dance with comedy and branched into dramatic roles on Broadway and early television. Her career was cut short, though, ending several years before her death at age 43, as she suffered complications from diabetes.

McCracken was generous in promoting the careers of other dancers, including Shirley MacLaine, and was a strong influence on her second husband, Bob Fosse, encouraging him to become a choreographer. She was noted for unconventional behavior and was one of a number of real-life counterparts to inspire the character of Holly Golightly in her friend Truman Capote's novella Breakfast at Tiffany's.

== Early life ==
Joan Hume McCracken was born in Philadelphia, Pennsylvania, on December 31, 1917, the daughter of Mary Humes and Franklin T. McCracken, a prominent sportswriter at the Philadelphia Public Ledger, who was an authority on golf and boxing.

By age 11, she was awarded a scholarship for acrobatic work at a Philadelphia gymnasium and later studied dance with Catherine Littlefield. She dropped out of West Philadelphia High School in the 10th grade to study dance in New York City with choreographer George Balanchine at the opening of the School of American Ballet in 1934.

== Career ==
=== Early career ===
In 1935, McCracken returned to Philadelphia to join Littlefield's new ballet company, the Littlefield Ballet (later known as the Philadelphia Ballet). When the company made its official debut in November 1935, McCracken was one of its principal soloists. In 1937, she went on a European tour with the company, in what was the first tour of an American ballet company in Europe. This put a strain on her health. McCracken had been recently diagnosed with type I diabetes (then known as "juvenile diabetes"), which was difficult to treat with the medical technology at the time, and the European tour made staying in compliance with her treatment regimen even harder for her.

McCracken kept her diabetes a secret throughout her life to prevent damage to her career. The disease made her prone to fainting spells, sometimes during performances, and led to medical complications later in her life.

In 1940, McCracken and her new husband Jack Dunphy, also a dancer, moved to New York City. At first, both failed to obtain employment, and McCracken danced in Radio City Music Hall's ballet company. The next year, she danced with the ballet company at Jacob's Pillow in the Berkshire Mountains of Massachusetts, and later that same year joined the Dance Players, formed by choreographer Eugene Loring, with Michael Kidd as Loring's assistant and leading male dancer.

=== Oklahoma! and Hollywood ===
In 1942, McCracken and Dunphy both successfully auditioned for roles in the dance ensemble of the new Rodgers and Hammerstein musical Away We Go. Agnes de Mille, who had just staged Aaron Copland's Rodeo for the Ballet Russe de Monte Carlo, was staging the production. The show went into rehearsals in early 1943. Like her husband, McCracken was cast in an anonymous dance role in the chorus. Early in out-of-town tryouts, she began to distinguish herself, and her dancing was noticed by reviewers. By the time of the Broadway opening of the show, now named Oklahoma!, she had developed her comic performance in the role of Sylvie, with McCracken taking a comic pratfall in the "Many a New Day" dance number. She became known as "the Girl Who Fell Down". Sources differ as to whether the role's distinctive fall was devised by McCracken or de Mille. McCracken has said the idea was hers, while de Mille and others recall it as being the choreographer's. Celeste Holm, a member of the original cast, attributed the idea to composer Richard Rodgers.

McCracken's performance in Oklahoma! led to a contract with Warner Bros. The studio cast her in Hollywood Canteen (1944), an all-star extravaganza in which Warner contract players portrayed themselves. McCracken appeared in a specialty dance routine called "Ballet in Jive". The dance number received favorable critical attention. McCracken was initially enthusiastic about working in films, but she was discouraged by her experiences working on Hollywood Canteen. Her husband and brother were both serving in the military, and she disliked the film's patronizing tone, which treated servicemen as naive bumpkins who are starstruck by the movie stars they encounter. McCracken also was dismayed by the unprofessionalism she witnessed at Warner Bros. and the lack of guidance she received from the choreographer, LeRoy Prinz.

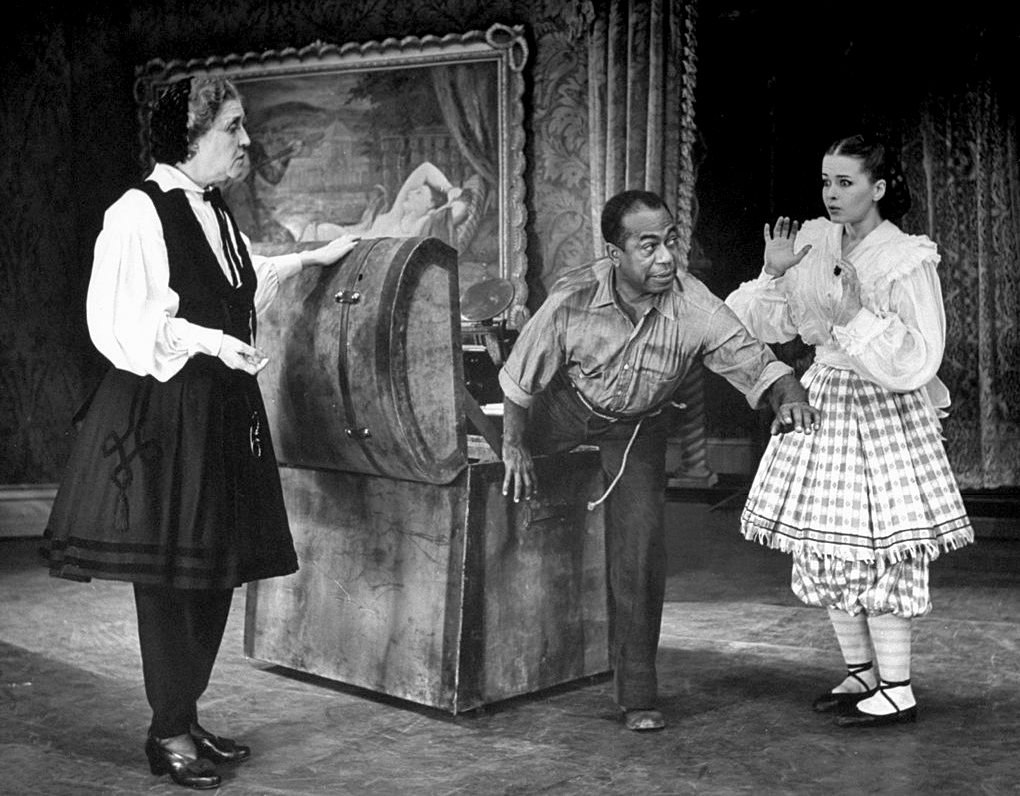
Margaret Douglass (Dolly Bloomer), Dooley Wilson (Pompey), and Joan McCracken (Daisy) in the Broadway production of Bloomer Girl (1944)

McCracken broke her Warner Bros. contract and went back to Broadway to appear in the musical Bloomer Girl (1944), set during the U.S. Civil War, which is widely considered to be the first Broadway musical about feminism. She received rave reviews for her performance, which combined comedy acting with dance. While not the highest-billed star in that show, her performance, especially of the satiric striptease "T'morra, T'morra", enhanced her reputation as a comic performer.

=== Broadway and television ===
She subsequently starred in Billion Dollar Baby, which opened on Broadway in December 1945, winning positive reviews for her performance. Her starring role in the play failed to further her career, for the show received only lukewarm reviews. After Billion Dollar Baby, she was hired by Metro-Goldwyn-Mayer to appear in the 1947 college musical Good News, starring June Allyson and Peter Lawford. She received good reviews playing the vivacious Babe Doolittle. Her song-and-dance number, "Pass That Peace Pipe", was a standout, but MGM did not renew her contract and her movie career never took off. Reviewing Good News for The Nation, critic and novelist James Agee wrote that McCracken "makes me think of a libidinous peanut."

In her study of the Hollywood studios' star-making process, The Star Machine, film historian Jeanine Basinger compared Debbie Reynolds with McCracken. Basinger noted a contrast between the two actresses, noting that unlike Reynolds, who was groomed for stardom by MGM and was a show-business novice, McCracken was "faux-fresh", a Broadway veteran who lacked "close-up appeal" and delivered her lines in the hard-edged, Broadway style, "reaching for that little old lady in the balcony."

McCracken had limited range as a singer, which prevented her from getting some Broadway parts. Shirley MacLaine described her as a "small, yet powerful woman with a foghorn voice." She long yearned to become a serious actress, and in 1947, she began studying acting with Bobby Lewis, Group Theatre alumnus, who would soon co-found the Actors Studio with Elia Kazan and Cheryl Crawford. That fall, at Lewis' invitation, McCracken became one of the studio's charter members.

The turning point in her acting career came in December 1947, when she appeared as Galileo's daughter Virginia in the New York City production of Bertolt Brecht's play Galileo, starring Charles Laughton in the title role and directed by Joseph Losey. Unlike her previous roles, Galileo was a straight dramatic role with no dancing. The play helped establish her reputation as a legitimate actress. She also studied acting with Sanford Meisner and Herbert Berghof at the Neighborhood Playhouse.

In 1949, she appeared in the Broadway production of the Clifford Odets play The Big Knife, a fierce indictment of Hollywood. The play was directed by Lee Strasberg and starred John Garfield as a film star who is being blackmailed by a studio boss for killing a child during a car accident some years earlier. At the time of the accident, the studio covered it up, and then used it as leverage on the Garfield character. McCracken plays a call girl, Dixie Evans, who was involved in the incident and threatens to talk about it. Her acting in the nondancing role was praised by critics, with Brooks Atkinson of The New York Times calling it an "inventive performance of real quality."

Her next role was not as helpful to her career. She appeared in the 1950 musical comedy Dance Me a Song, which turned out to be a flop, though it was choreographed by Agnes de Mille, who had won acclaim for Oklahoma! a few years earlier. As one of the play's principal stars, she appeared in several scenes, but the choreography was ravaged by critics, as was the play, and reviews of her performance were mixed.

McCracken starred with Eddie Dowling, a veteran Broadway actor, in the play Angel in the Pawnshop, in a 1950 tour and on Broadway in 1951. She played a young woman seeking to escape from her marriage to a homicidal thief, in a pawnshop owned by Dowling's character. While in the pawnshop, she puts on old clothing and fantasizes that she is living in happier times. Although she engaged in some choreographed dancing during the play, it was a straight dramatic role. While the play was being prepared for Broadway, in October 1950, she appeared on television in the premiere of the Pulitzer Prize Playhouse, playing Essie in You Can't Take It with You. At that time, McCracken gave an interview disparaging what she described as the "over-commercialization" of television, which might have hurt her career in the new medium. Reviews for Angel in the Pawnshop were negative, and she received mixed reviews for her performance.

She went on to appear in Peter Pan, a 1951 Broadway revival adapted from the 1904 J.M. Barrie play. She starred in the title role in a touring company production in 1951, succeeding Jean Arthur. The play was not a musical, and was different from the subsequent version starring Mary Martin a few years later, but had five songs by Leonard Bernstein. Captain Hook was played by Boris Karloff. Her performance in Peter Pan was praised by critics, and it was her favorite acting role.

In 1952, she had the title role in one of the first television situation comedies, Claudia: The Story of a Marriage, based on a film series in which the title role was played by Dorothy McGuire. McCracken played opposite Broadway actor Hugh Reilly.

McCracken next appeared on Broadway in the 1953 Rodgers and Hammerstein musical Me and Juliet. The choreography was by Robert Alton, who had worked with McCracken on Good News. The play was meant to show what it was like to be backstage during the run of a hit Broadway show, and she performed opposite Ray Walston in the "show within a show." Although her performance received good reviews, the play did not, and it did little to help her career.

=== Decline ===
Despite favorable reviews of her performances in The Big Knife and Peter Pan, her worsening health and the failure of her most recent Broadway plays took a toll on her career. As her health declined, she found that her dancing ability was affected. She suffered a severe heart attack in 1955, followed by a possible second attack, and then developed pneumonia, which required an extended stay in the hospital. She hid the severity of her health problems, but some details became public. Upon release from the hospital, McCracken was told by her doctors that she could no longer dance. The news was devastating to her.

Although she appeared on television and in dramatic roles, her career petered out in the late 1950s, as complications from her diabetes made her working increasingly difficult. Her final stage appearance was in a 1958 off-Broadway production of Jean Cocteau's 1934 play, The Infernal Machine, appearing alongside John Kerr and June Havoc.

== Personal life ==
McCracken was noted for her eccentric behavior. She was uninhibited, and at times seemed to enjoy behaving outrageously. In one meeting with MGM vocal coach Kay Thompson, she removed her blouse and bra to become "more comfortable."

She met Jack Dunphy, then a dancer with the Littlefield company, in 1937. They married in 1939 and separated after Dunphy's service during World War II, during which McCracken had an affair with French composer Rudi Revil. Dunphy later privately came out as gay, became romantically involved with Truman Capote, and McCracken and he were divorced in 1948. Dunphy remained Capote's partner until Capote died in 1984.

McCracken met dancer-choreographer Bob Fosse while both were appearing in the 1950 Broadway musical Dance Me a Song, in which she had a starring role and he was a specialty dancer. She was married to him from December 1952 to 1959. She worked actively to advance his career and encouraged his work as a choreographer. Her intervention with producer George Abbott led to his first major job as a choreographer, in The Pajama Game. They divorced as her health worsened, and as Fosse, who was serially unfaithful in his marriages, left McCracken for Gwen Verdon.

Later in life, she was in a relationship with actor Marc Adams, and spent many of her final years at a beach house in what was then an isolated section of The Pines on Fire Island, New York.

McCracken died in her sleep from a heart attack brought on by her diabetes, on November 1, 1961. She was cremated at her request. Her ashes, which were given to her mother, were subsequently lost.

== Legacy ==
McCracken was known for her pixieish stage and screen persona, and for what The New York Times described as her "overnight" success as a comic dancer in Oklahoma! The Times described her as "an enchanting new talent with a flair for puckish comedy." Her influence on musical comedy and other performers was considerable. Shirley MacLaine said that McCracken had "a sense of 'in your face' comedy years before it was fashionable ... and she possessed a generosity about other people's talent."

In her biography of McCracken, The Girl Who Fell Down, dance critic Lisa Jo Sagolla says that McCracken is little remembered today, and not widely appreciated for her influence on Fosse, and for her efforts to encourage him to move from dance to choreography. Though her career went into a sharp decline in the 1950s due to her diabetes, she directly influenced the career of MacLaine, as well as Fosse, and was a pioneer in combining comedy and dance.

McCracken was one of the real-life counterparts of Holly Golightly in Truman Capote's popular novella Breakfast at Tiffany's. While playing in Bloomer Girl in October 1944, she received a War Department telegram telling her of the death of her brother, Buddy McCracken, a month earlier during particularly vicious combat on the Pacific island of Peleliu. She reacted violently when she heard the news, tearing up her dressing room. McCracken told Capote of the incident, and he used it in the novella. In the book, Holly Golightly has a violent outburst in reaction to her brother's death during Army service overseas. Golightly is shown singing songs from Oklahoma!, accompanying herself on a guitar, and owning The Baseball Guide, which was edited by McCracken's uncle James Isaminger.

In Bob Fosse's autobiographical film All That Jazz (1979), the character of Angelique, a death angel, is played by Jessica Lange. Angelique's personality traits resemble McCracken's and she appears dressed just as McCracken was in The Infernal Machine, her final stage appearance.

McCracken is played by Susan Misner in Fosse/Verdon, a television limited series about the relationship between Fosse and Gwen Verdon.

== Credits ==
=== Broadway ===
- Oklahoma! (1943–44)
- Bloomer Girl (1944–45)
- Billion Dollar Baby (1945–46)
- The Big Knife (1949)
- Dance Me a Song (1950)
- Peter Pan (1950)
- Angel in the Pawnshop (1951)
- Me and Juliet (1953–54)

=== Off-Broadway ===
- The Infernal Machine (1958)

=== Films ===
- Hollywood Canteen (1944)
- Good News (1947)
- That's Dancing! (1985) – footage from Good News
- That's Entertainment! III (1994) – footage from Good News

=== Television ===
- Actors Studio ("Night Club", 1948)
- Great Catherine (1948)
- Pulitzer Prize Playhouse ("You Can't Take It with You," 1950)
- Versatile Varieties (May 4, 1950)
- Claudia: The Story of a Marriage (1952)
- The Revlon Mirror Theater (1953) "White Night," August 4, 1953.
- Toast of the Town, Episode #6.46 (1953)
