= Jerome Robbins =

American choreographer and director (1918–1998)

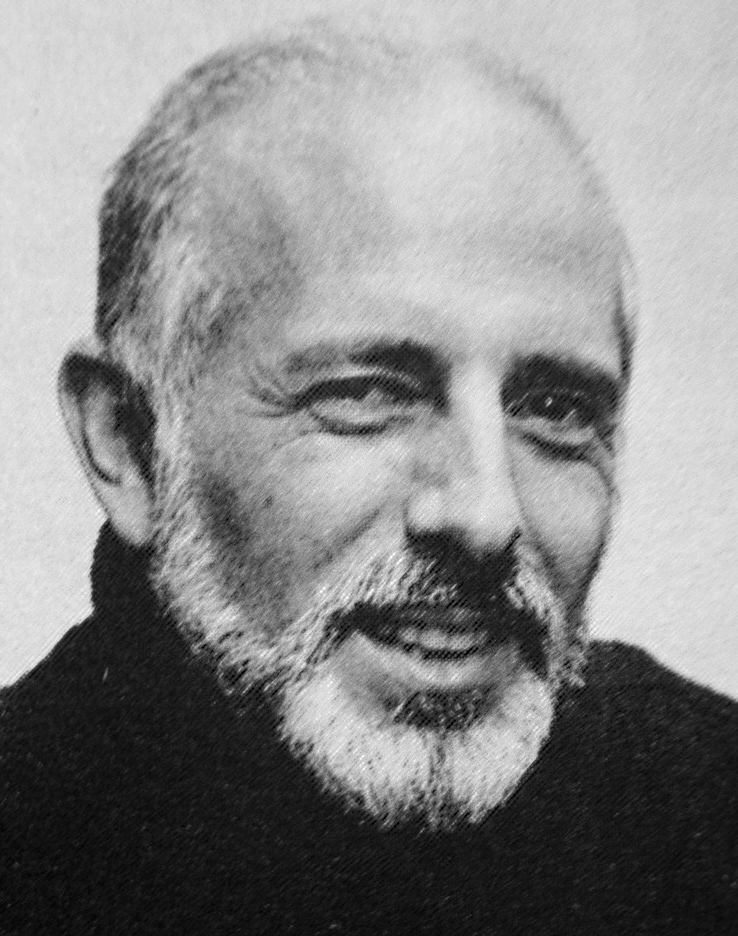
- Robbins in 1968
- Born: Jerome Wilson Rabinowitz; October 11, 1918; New York City, U.S.
- Died: July 29, 1998 (aged 79); New York City, U.S.
- Occupations: Dancer; choreographer; film director; theatre director; theatre producer
- Years active: 1937–1998
- Awards: Full list

Jerome Robbins (born Jerome Wilson Rabinowitz; October 11, 1918 – July 29, 1998) was an American dancer, choreographer, film director, theatre director and producer who worked in classical ballet, and on stage, film, and television.

Among his numerous stage productions were On the Town, Peter Pan, High Button Shoes, The King and I, The Pajama Game, Bells Are Ringing, West Side Story, Gypsy, and Fiddler on the Roof. Robbins was a five-time Tony Award-winner and a recipient of the Kennedy Center Honors. He received two Academy Awards, including the 1961 Academy Award for Best Director with Robert Wise for West Side Story and a special Academy Honorary Award for his choreographic achievements on film.

A documentary about Robbins's life and work, Something to Dance About, featuring excerpts from his journals, archival performance and rehearsal footage, and interviews with Robbins and his colleagues, premiered on PBS in 2009 and won both an Emmy and a Peabody Award the same year.

== Early life ==
Robbins was born Jerome Wilson Rabinowitz in the Jewish Maternity Hospital at 270 East Broadway on Manhattan's Lower East Side – a neighborhood populated by many immigrants. He was the son of Lena (née Rips) and Harry Rabinowitz (1887–1977). He had an older sister, Sonia (1912–2004).

The Rabinowitz family lived in a large apartment house at 51 East 97th Street at the northeast corner of Madison Avenue. Known as "Jerry" to those close to him, Robbins was given the middle name Wilson reflecting his parents' enthusiasm for the then-president, Woodrow Wilson.

In the early 1920s, the Rabinowitz family moved to Weehawken, New Jersey. His father and uncle opened the Comfort Corset Company in nearby Union City. He graduated in 1935 from Woodrow Wilson High School (since renamed as Weehawken High School). The family had many show business connections, including vaudeville performers and theater owners. In the 1940s, their name was legally changed to Robbins.

Robbins began studying modern dance in high school with Alys Bentley, who encouraged her pupils to improvise steps to music. Said Robbins later: "What [she] gave me immediately was the absolute freedom to make up my own dances without inhibition or doubts." After graduation he went to study chemistry at New York University (NYU) but dropped out after a year for financial reasons, and to pursue dance full-time. He joined the company of Senya Gluck Sandor, a leading exponent of expressionistic modern dance; it was Sandor who recommended that he change his name to Robbins. Sandor also encouraged him to take ballet, which he did with Ella Daganova; in addition he studied Spanish dancing with Helen Veola; Asian dance with Yeichi Nimura; and dance composition with Bessie Schonberg. While a member of Sandor's company Robbins made his stage debut with the Yiddish Art Theater, in a small role in The Brothers Ashkenazi.

== Career ==
=== 1930s and 40s ===
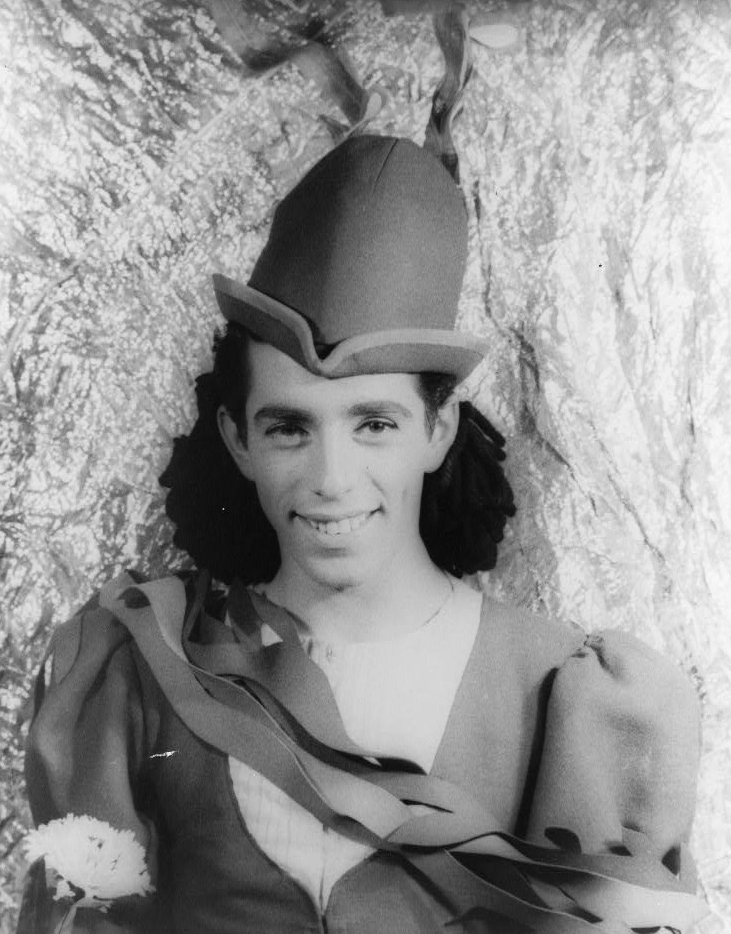
Robbins in Three Virgins and a Devil, 1941

In the 1930s, Robbins studied acting with Margaret Barker at the Studio Workshop Theatre. In 1937, he made the first of many appearances as a dancer at Camp Tamiment, a resort in the Poconos known for its weekly Broadway-style revues; and he began dancing in the choruses of Broadway shows, including Great Lady and Keep Off the Grass, both choreographed by George Balanchine. Robbins had also begun creating dances for Tamiment's Revues, some of them comic (featuring the talents of Imogene Coca and Carol Channing) and some dramatic, topical, and controversial. One such dance, later also performed in New York City at the 92nd Street Y, was Strange Fruit, set to the song of the same name sung by Billie Holiday.

In 1940, Robbins joined Ballet Theatre (later known as American Ballet Theatre). From 1941 through 1944, Robbins was a soloist with the company, attracting notice for his performance as Hermes in Helen of Troy, the title role in Petrouchka, the Youth in Agnes de Mille's Three Virgins and a Devil, and Benvolio in Romeo and Juliet; he also came under the influence of the choreographers Michel Fokine, Antony Tudor, and George Balanchine.

The Fleet's In!, painted by Paul Cadmus, 1934, the inspiration for the ballet, Fancy Free (1944)

During this period, Robbins created Fancy Free, a ballet with a screwball-comedy plot about sailors on leave that combined classical ballet with 1940s social dancing. He performed in it when it was presented at the Metropolitan Opera as part of the Ballet Theatre's 1944 season. He said that one of his inspirations for this ballet had been Paul Cadmus's 1934 painting The Fleet's In!, even though it was lighthearted, which the painting decidedly was not. Robbins said in an interview with The Christian Science Monitor: "After seeing ... Fleet's In, which I inwardly rejected though it gave me the idea of doing the ballet, I watched sailors, and girls, too, all over town." Robbins commissioned the score for the ballet from Leonard Bernstein, who was a relatively unknown composer at the time. He also enlisted Oliver Smith as set designer.

Later that year, Robbins conceived and choreographed On the Town (1944), a musical partly inspired by Fancy Free, which effectively launched his Broadway career. Bernstein wrote the music and Smith designed the sets. The book and lyrics were written by a team that Robbins would work with again, Betty Comden and Adolph Green, and the director was the Broadway legend George Abbott. Because Robbins, as choreographer, insisted that his chorus reflect the racial diversity of a New York City crowd, On the Town broke the color bar on Broadway for the first time. Robbins's next musical was a jazz-age fable, Billion Dollar Baby (1945). During rehearsals for it, an incident happened that became a part of Robbins – and Broadway – lore: the choreographer, preoccupied by giving directions to the dancers, backed up onstage until he fell into the orchestra pit. Two years later, Robbins received plaudits for his humorous Mack Sennett ballet, High Button Shoes (1947), and won his first Tony Award for choreography. That same year, Robbins would become one of the first members of New York City's newly formed Actors Studio, attending classes held by founding member Robert Lewis three times a week, alongside classmates including Marlon Brando, Maureen Stapleton, Montgomery Clift, Herbert Berghof, Sidney Lumet, and about 20 others. In 1948 he added another credit to his resume, becoming co-director as well as choreographer for Look Ma, I'm Dancin'!; the year after that he teamed with Irving Berlin to choreograph Miss Liberty.

While he was forging a career on Broadway, Robbins continued to work in ballet, creating a string of inventive and stylistically diverse ballets, including Interplay, which was set to a score by Morton Gould, and Facsimile, which was set to music by Leonard Bernstein and was banned in Boston [CK]. In 1949 Robbins left Ballet Theatre to join George Balanchine and Lincoln Kirstein's newly formed New York City Ballet as Associate Artistic Director. Soon after that he choreographed The Guests, a ballet about intolerance.

=== 1950s ===
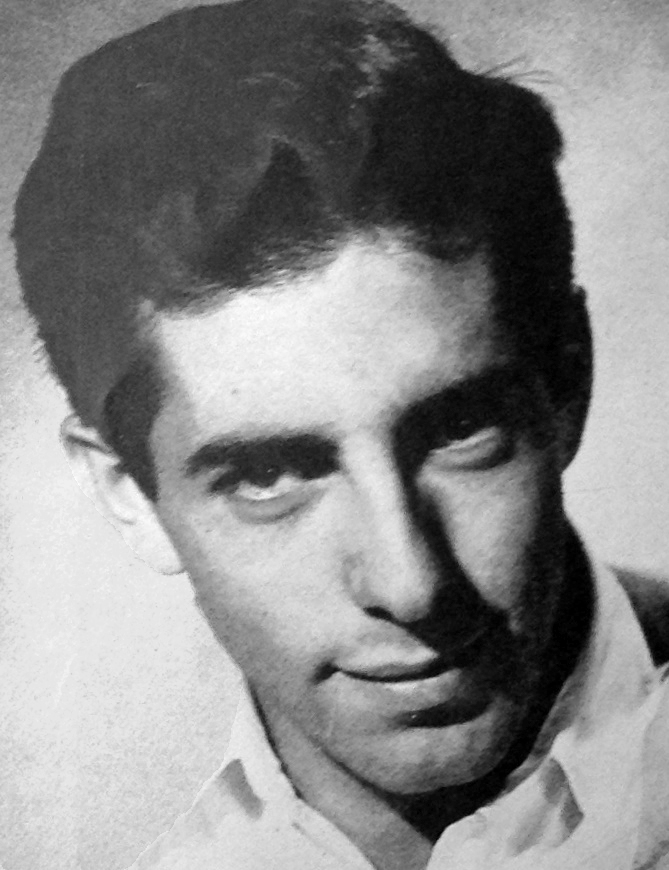
Robbins in 1951

At New York City Ballet Robbins distinguished himself immediately as both dancer and choreographer. He was noted for his performances in Balanchine's 1929 "The Prodigal Son" (revived expressly for him), Til Eulenspiegel, and (with Tanaquil LeClercq) Bouree Fantasque, as well as for his own ballets, such as Age of Anxiety, The Cage, Afternoon of a Faun, and The Concert, in all of which LeClercq played leading roles. He continued working on Broadway as well as staging dances for Irving Berlin's Call Me Madam, starring Ethel Merman, Rodgers and Hammerstein's The King and I, in which he created the celebrated "Small House of Uncle Thomas" ballet in addition to other dances, and the revue Two's Company, starring Bette Davis.

He also performed uncredited show doctoring on the musicals A Tree Grows in Brooklyn (1951), Wish You Were Here (1952), Wonderful Town (1953), and choreographed and directed several sketches for The Ford 50th Anniversary Show, starring Mary Martin and Ethel Merman on CBS.

In 1954, Robbins collaborated with George Abbott on The Pajama Game (1954), which launched the career of Shirley MacLaine, and created, choreographed, and directed the Mary Martin vehicle, Peter Pan (which he re-staged for an Emmy Award-winning television special in 1955, earning himself a nomination for best choreography). He also directed and co-choreographed (with Bob Fosse) Bells Are Ringing (1956), starring Judy Holliday. Robbins recreated his stage dances for The King and I for the 1956 film version. In 1957, he conceived, choreographed, and directed West Side Story.

West Side Story is a contemporary version of Romeo and Juliet, set on the Upper West Side. The show, with music by Leonard Bernstein, marked the first collaboration between Robbins and Stephen Sondheim, who wrote the lyrics, as well as Arthur Laurents, who wrote the book. Because book, music, and dance were envisioned as an organic whole, the cast, in a Broadway first, had to be equally skilled as actors, singers, and dancers. To help the young cast grow into their roles, Robbins did not allow those playing members of opposite gangs (Jets and Sharks) to mix during the rehearsal process. He also, according to dancer Linda Talcott Lee, "played psychological games" with the cast: "And he would plant rumors among one gang about the other, so they really hated each other." Although it opened to good reviews, it was overshadowed by Meredith Willson's The Music Man at that year's Tony Awards. West Side Story did, however, earn Robbins his second Tony Award for choreography.

The streak of hits continued with Gypsy (1959), starring Ethel Merman. Robbins re-teamed with Sondheim and Laurents, and the music was by Jule Styne. The musical is based (loosely) on the life of stripper Gypsy Rose Lee.

In 1956 Robbins's muse, Tanaquil LeClercq, contracted polio and was paralyzed; for the next decade Robbins largely withdrew from his activities at New York City Ballet, but he established his own small dance company, Ballets USA, which premiered at the inaugural season of Gian Carlo Menotti's Festival of the Two Worlds in Spoleto, Italy in June 1958, toured Europe and the US under the auspices of the State Department, and appeared on television on The Ed Sullivan Show. Among the dances he created for Ballets USA were N.Y. Export: Opus Jazz and Moves.

==== House Un-American Activities Committee ====
In 1950, Robbins was called to testify before the House Committee on Un-American Activities (HUAC), suspected of Communist sympathies. Robbins, though willing to confess to past party membership, resisted naming names of others with similar political connections; he held out for three years until, according to two family members in whom he confided, he was threatened with public exposure of his homosexuality. Robbins named the names of persons he said were Communists, including actors Lloyd Gough and Elliot Sullivan, dance critic Edna Ocko, filmmaker Lionel Berman, playwright Jerome Chodorov, his brother Edward Chodorov, Madeline Lee Gilford and her husband Jack Gilford, who were blacklisted for their perceived political beliefs and their careers suffered noticeably, to the point that they often had to borrow money from friends. Because he cooperated with HUAC, Robbins's career did not visibly suffer and he was not blacklisted.

=== 1960s ===
Rehearsals for West Side Story, 1960

In 1960, Robbins co-directed, with Robert Wise, the film adaptation of West Side Story. After about 45 days of shooting, he was fired when the production was considered 24 days behind schedule. However, when the film received 10 Academy Awards for the 1961 award year, Robbins won two, one for his Direction and one for "Brilliant Achievements in the Art of Choreography on Film".

In 1962, Robbins directed Arthur Kopit's non-musical play Oh Dad, Poor Dad, Mamma's Hung You in the Closet and I'm Feelin' So Sad. The production ran over a year off-Broadway and was transferred to Broadway for a short run in 1963, after which Robbins directed Anne Bancroft in a revival of Bertolt Brecht's Mother Courage and Her Children.

Robbins was still highly sought after as a show doctor. He took over the direction of two troubled productions during this period and helped turn them into successes. In 1962, he saved A Funny Thing Happened on the Way to the Forum (1962), a musical farce starring Zero Mostel, Jack Gilford, David Burns, and John Carradine. The production, with book by Burt Shevelove and Larry Gelbart, and score by Stephen Sondheim, was not working. Sondheim wrote and Robbins staged an entirely new opening number, "Comedy Tonight", which explained to the audience what was to follow, and the show played successfully from then on. In 1964, he took on a floundering Funny Girl and devised a show that ran 1348 performances. The musical helped turn lead Barbra Streisand into a superstar.

That same year, Robbins won Tony Awards for his direction and choreography in Fiddler on the Roof (1964). The show starred Zero Mostel as Tevye and ran for 3242 performances, setting the record (since surpassed) for longest-running Broadway show. The plot, about Jews living in Russia near the beginning of the 20th century, allowed Robbins to return to his religious roots.

=== 1970s and 1980s ===
He continued to choreograph and stage productions for both the Joffrey Ballet and the New York City Ballet into the 1970s. Robbins became ballet master of the New York City Ballet in 1972 and worked almost exclusively in classical dance throughout the next decade, pausing only to stage revivals of West Side Story (1980) and Fiddler on the Roof (1981). In 1981, his Chamber Dance Company toured the People's Republic of China.

The 1980s saw an increased presence on TV as NBC aired Live From Studio 8H: An Evening of Jerome Robbins' Ballets with members of the New York City Ballet, and a retrospective of Robbins's choreography aired on PBS in a 1986 installment of Dance in America. The latter led to his creating the anthology show Jerome Robbins' Broadway in 1989 which recreated the most successful production numbers from his 50-plus year career. Starring Jason Alexander as the narrator (a performance that would win Alexander a Tony), the show included stagings of cut numbers like Irving Berlin's Mr. Monotony and well-known ones like the "Tradition" number from Fiddler on the Roof. He was awarded a fifth Tony Award for it.

=== 1990s ===
Following a bicycle accident in 1990 and heart-valve surgery in 1994, in 1996 he began showing signs of a form of Parkinson's disease, and his hearing was quickly deteriorating. He nevertheless staged Les Noces for City Ballet in 1998, his last project.

=== Death ===
Robbins suffered a stroke in July 1998, two months after the premiere of his re-staging of Les Noces. He died at his home in New York on July 29, 1998. On the evening of his death, the lights of Broadway were dimmed for a moment in tribute. He was cremated and his ashes were scattered on the Atlantic Ocean.

== Personal life ==
Robbins had romantic relationships with a number of people, including Montgomery Clift, Nora Kaye, Buzz Miller, and Jess Gerstein. As a former Communist Party member, he named 10 communists in his testimony before the House Un-American Activities Committee. Although he gave this testimony only after years of pressure, and threats to make public his sexual orientation, his naming names caused resentment among some of his artistic colleagues, including blacklisted actors Jack Gilford and Zero Mostel, who, while working on Fiddler on the Roof "openly disdained Robbins". Leonard Bernstein and Arthur Laurents worked with him on West Side Story only a few years after they had been blacklisted.

== Awards ==
Robbins shared the Academy Award for Best Director with Robert Wise for the film version of West Side Story (1961). Robbins was only the second director to win the Academy Award for Best Director for a film debut (after Delbert Mann for Marty). That same year, the Academy of Motion Picture Arts and Sciences honored him with a special Academy Honorary Award for his choreographic achievements on film.

In all, he was awarded with five Tony Awards, two Academy Awards (including the special Academy Honorary Award), the Kennedy Center Honors (1981), the National Medal of Arts (1988), the French Legion of Honor, and an Honorary Membership in the American Academy and Institute of Arts and Letters. He was awarded three honorary doctorates including an Honorary Doctor of Humane Letters in 1980 from the City University of New York and an Honorary Doctor of Fine Arts from New York University in 1985.

Jerome Robbins was inducted into the American Theater Hall of Fame in 1979. Robbins was inducted into the National Museum of Dance's Mr. & Mrs. Cornelius Vanderbilt Whitney Hall of Fame 10 years later, in 1989.

=== Jerome Robbins Award ===
In 1995, Jerome Robbins instructed the directors of his foundation to establish a prize for "some really greatly outstanding person or art institution. The prizes should 'lean toward the arts of dance...'" The first two Jerome Robbins Awards were bestowed in 2003 to New York City Ballet and to lighting designer Jennifer Tipton.

== Broadway productions and notable ballets ==
- 1939 Stars in Your Eyes – musical – performer in the role of "Gentleman of the Ballet"
- 1939 The Straw Hat Revue – revue – performer
- 1941 Giselle – ballet – dancer in the role of a "Peasant"
- 1941 Three Virgins and a Devil – ballet to the music of Ottorino Respighi, dancer in the role of the "Youth"
- 1941 Gala Performance – ballet to the music of Serge Prokofiev – dancer in the role of an "Attendant Cavalier"
- 1944 On the Town – musical – choreographer and the originator of the idea for the show
- 1945 Common Ground – play – co-director
- 1945 Interplay – ballet to the music of Morton Gould – choreographer and dancer
- 1945 Billion Dollar Baby – musical – choreographer
- 1946 Fancy Free – ballet (revival) – original played at the Metropolitan Opera House in 1944
- 1947 High Button Shoes – musical – choreographer – Tony Award for Best Choreography
- 1948 Look, Ma, I'm Dancin'! – musical – choreographer, co-director, and the originator of the idea for the show
- 1949 Miss Liberty – musical – choreographer
- 1950 Call Me Madam – musical – choreographer
- 1951 The King and I – musical – choreographer
- 1951 The Cage – ballet to music of Igor Stravinsky – choreographer
- 1952 Interplay - ballet to music of Morton Gould – choreographer
- 1952 Two's Company – revue – choreographer
- 1953 Afternoon of a Faun – ballet to the music of Claude Debussy – choreographer
- 1954 The Pajama Game – musical – co-director
- 1954 Peter Pan – musical – director and choreographer
- 1956 The Concert (or the Perils of Everybody) – ballet to the music of Frédéric Chopin – choreographer
- 1956 Bells Are Ringing – musical – director and co-choreographer with Bob Fosse – Tony co-Nominee for Best Choreography
- 1957 West Side Story – musical – choreographer, director – Tony Award for Best Choreography
- 1958 3 x 3 – ballet to the music of Georges Auric – choreographer
- 1958 New York Export: Opus Jazz – ballet to the music of Robert Prince, choreographer
- 1959 Gypsy – musical – choreographer and director – Tony Award Nomination for Best Direction of a Musical
- 1959 Moves – silent ballet – choreographer
- 1962 A Funny Thing Happened on the Way to the Forum – musical – uncredited directing and choreography assistant
- 1963 Mother Courage and Her Children – play – co-producer and director – Tony Award nomination for Best Play, and Best Producer of a Play
- 1963 Oh Dad, Poor Dad, Mamma's Hung You in the Closet and I'm Feelin' So Sad – play – director
- 1964 Funny Girl – musical – production supervisor
- 1964 Fiddler on the Roof – musical – director and choreographer – Tony Award for Best Direction of a Musical, and Best Choreography
- 1966 The Office – never officially opened – director
- 1969 Dances at a Gathering – ballet to the music of Frédéric Chopin – choreographer
- 1970 In the Night – ballet to the music of Frédéric Chopin – choreographer
- 1971 The Goldberg Variations (ballet) - ballet to the music of Johann Sebastian Bach – choreographer
- 1979 The Four Seasons (ballet) - ballet to the music of Giuseppe Verdi – choreographer
- 1975 In G Major (ballet) - ballet to the music of Maurice Ravel – choreographer
- 1983 I'm Old Fashioned – ballet to Morton Gould's adaptation of Jerome Kern's theme – choreographer
- 1983 Glass Pieces – ballet to the music of Philip Glass – choreographer
- 1989 Jerome Robbins' Broadway – revue – director and choreographer – Tony Award for Best Direction of a Musical

== Bibliography ==
- Lawrence, Greg (2001). Dance with Demons: The Life of Jerome Robbins. G.P. Putnam's Sons. ISBN 0-399-14652-0. OCLC 45015298.
- Jowitt, Deborah (2005). Jerome Robbins: His Life, His Theater, His Dance. Simon & Schuster. ISBN 978-0-684-86986-5.
- Vaill, Amanda (2006). Somewhere: The Life of Jerome Robbins. Broadway. ISBN 978-0-7679-0420-9.
- Conrad, Christine (2001). Jerome Robbins: That Broadway Man, Booth-Clibborn ISBN 1-86154-173-2
- Emmet Long, Robert (2001). Broadway, the Golden Years: Jerome Robbins and the Great Choreographer Directors, 1940 to the Present. Continuum International Publishing Group. ISBN 0-8264-1462-1
- Altman, Richard (1971). The Making of a Musical: Fiddler on the Roof. Crown Publishers.
- Thelen, Lawrence (1999). The Show Makers: Great Directors of the American Musical Theatre. Routledge.ISBN 0415923468

== Articles ==
- NY Times, August 9, 1998
- Riding, Alan (March 12, 1999). "In Paris, Paying Tribute to Jerome Robbins With Pomp and Humor". The New York Times.
- NY Times, Alastair Macaulay, April 27, 2008
- obituary, NY Times, Anna Kisselgoff, July 30, 1998
