= Agnes de Mille =

American dancer and choreographer (1905–1993)

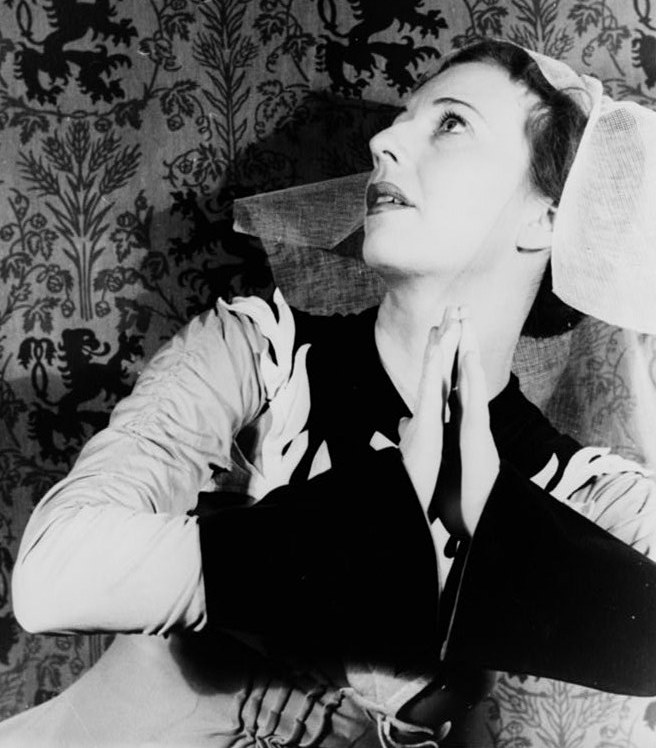
- Agnes de Mille (1941) playing 'The Priggish Virgin' in the ballet Three Virgins and a Devil (Tre Vergini e un Diavolo) photographed by Carl Van Vechten
- Born: Agnes George de Mille; September 18, 1905; New York City, U.S.
- Died: October 7, 1993 (aged 88); New York City, U.S.
- Occupations: Choreographer; dancer
- Years active: 1910s–1990s
- Spouse: Walter Prude (m. 1943)
- Children: 1
- Parents: William C. deMille; Anna George de Mille
- Relatives: Peggy George (sister); Henry George (grandfather); Henry Churchill de Mille (grandfather); Matilda Beatrice deMille (grandmother); Cecil B. DeMille (uncle); Katherine DeMille (cousin); Richard de Mille (cousin)
- Awards: American Theater Hall of Fame 1973; Kennedy Center Honors 1980; National Medal of Arts 1986

Agnes de Mille (September 18, 1905 – October 7, 1993), born as Agnes George de Mille, was an American dancer and choreographer.

== Early years ==
Agnes de Mille was born in New York City into a well-connected family of theater professionals. Her father William C. deMille and her uncle Cecil B. DeMille were both Hollywood directors. Her mother, Anna Angela George, was the daughter of Henry George, the economist. On her father's side, Agnes was the granddaughter of playwrights Henry Churchill de Mille and Matilda Beatrice deMille. Her paternal grandmother was of German-Jewish descent.

She had a love for acting and originally wanted to be an actress, but was told that she was "not pretty enough", so she turned her attention to dance. In 1919, she enrolled in the Kosloff School of Dance in Los Angeles and was taught by Theodore Kosloff and his partner Natacha Rambova. When de Mille's younger sister was prescribed ballet classes to cure her flat feet, de Mille joined her. De Mille lacked flexibility and technique, though, and did not have a dancer's body. Classical ballet was the most widely known dance form at this time, and de Mille's apparent lack of ability limited her opportunities. She taught herself from watching film stars on the set with her father in Hollywood; these were more interesting for her to watch than perfectly turned out legs, and she developed strong character work and compelling performances. At this time, dance was considered more of an activity, rather than a viable career option, so her parents refused to allow her to pursue it. She did not seriously consider dancing as a career until after she graduated from college.

De Mille graduated from UCLA with a degree in English where she was a member of Kappa Alpha Theta sorority, and in 1933 moved to London to study with Dame Marie Rambert, eventually joining Rambert's company, The Ballet Club, later Ballet Rambert, and Antony Tudor's London Ballet.

== Career ==
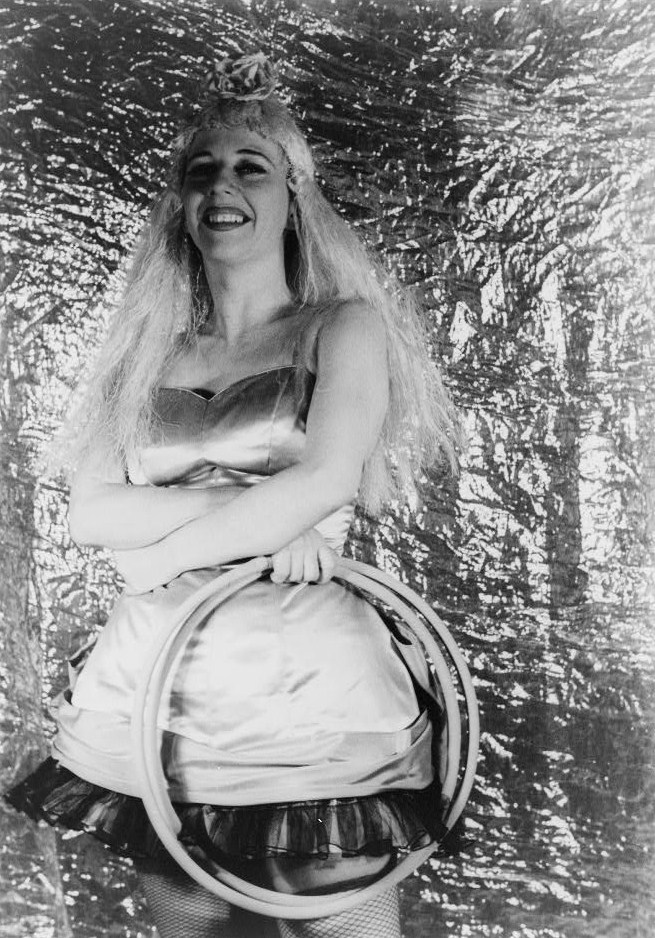
Agnes de Mille in 1940

One of de Mille's early jobs, thanks to her father's connections, was choreographing Cecil B. DeMille's film Cleopatra (1934). DeMille's dance director LeRoy Prinz clashed with the younger de Mille. Her uncle always deferred to Prinz, even after agreeing to his niece's dances in advance, and Agnes de Mille left the film.

De Mille arrived in New York in 1938 and later began her association with the American Ballet Theatre (then called the Ballet Theatre) in 1939. One of de Mille's first pieces was Black Ritual (Obeah), which she began choreographing for the newly formed Ballet Theatre's first season. Lasting 25 minutes, this performance was created for the "Negro Unit" of the dance company and was performed by 16 black ballerinas. This was the first representation of black dancers in a New York ballet performance within the context of a dominantly white company. Therefore, although it was only performed three times before being disbanded, Black Ritual was an unprecedented performance, changing perceptions about black ballet dancers and marking a significant milestone in American ballet history.

De Mille's first recognized significant work was Rodeo (1942), whose score was by Aaron Copland, and which she staged for the Ballet Russe de Monte Carlo. Although de Mille continued to choreograph nearly up to the time of her death—her final ballet, The Other, was completed in 1992—most of her later works have dropped out of the ballet repertoire. Besides Rodeo, two other de Mille ballets are performed regularly, Three Virgins and a Devil (1934) adapted from a tale by Giovanni Boccaccio, and Fall River Legend (1948) based on the life of Lizzie Borden.

While she lived in New York and was working for Ballet Theatre in 1941, de Mille choreographed Drums Sound in Hackensack for the Jooss Ballet (originally located in Germany), which had just moved to New York in 1939. This was an important step in the company's history as it was the first performance not choreographed by Kurt Jooss himself. Although there are no film recordings of the performance, de Mille's choreography notes and personal reflections of the dancers shed light on the characteristics of the performance. The piece was placed in a historical context with an American theme and fit the traditional mold for de Mille's pieces featuring a female perspective. As one of the first pieces de Mille choreographed for a group of dancers rather than simply one or two people, the performance was significant in her career as a choreographer.

After her success with Rodeo de Mille was hired to choreograph the musical Oklahoma! (1943). The dream ballet, in which dancers Marc Platt, Katherine Sergava, and George Church doubled for the leading actors, successfully integrated dance into the musical's plot. Instead of functioning as an interlude or divertissement, the ballet provided key insights into the heroine's emotional troubles. This performance exemplifies how de Mille brought new ideas to the performing arts, integrating dance to enhance the musical. This production is widely known for this innovative idea and is credited for starting de Mille's fame as a choreographer, both for Broadway and in the dance industry. De Mille went on to choreograph over a dozen other musicals, most notably Bloomer Girl (1944), which presented her feelings of loneliness as a woman who saw her husband leave to serve for the army, Carousel (1945), Allegro (1947, director as well as choreographer), Brigadoon (1947, for which she was co-recipient of the inaugural Tony Award for Best Choreography), Gentlemen Prefer Blondes (1949), Paint Your Wagon (1951), The Girl in Pink Tights (1954), Goldilocks (1957), and 110 in the Shade (1963). These many dance performances within musical theater enriched Broadway musicals by how they provided perspective on the events of the time.

De Mille's success on Broadway did not translate into success in film. Her only significant film credit is Oklahoma! (1955). She was not invited to recreate her choreography for either Brigadoon (1954) or Carousel (1956). Nevertheless, her two specials for the Omnibus TV series titled "The Art of Ballet" and "The Art of Choreography" (both televised in 1956) were immediately recognized as landmark attempts to bring serious dance to the attention of a broad public.

During his presidency, John F. Kennedy appointed de Mille a member of the National Advisory Committee on the Arts, the predecessor to the National Endowment for the Arts, to which she was appointed by President Lyndon B. Johnson after its creation.

Her love for acting played a very important role in her choreography. De Mille revolutionized musical theatre by creating choreography that not only conveyed the emotional dimensions of the characters but enhanced the plot. Her choreography, as a reflection of her awareness of acting, reflected the angst and turmoil of the characters instead of simply focusing on a dancer's physical technique.

De Mille regularly worked with a recognizable core group of dancers, including Virginia Bosler (Doris), Gemze de Lappe, Lidija Franklin, Jean Houloose, Dania Krupska, Bambi Linn, Joan McCracken, James Mitchell, Mavis Ray, and, at American Ballet Theatre, Sallie Wilson. Krupska, Mitchell, and Ray served as de Mille's assistant choreographers, and de Lappe took an active role in preserving de Mille's work.

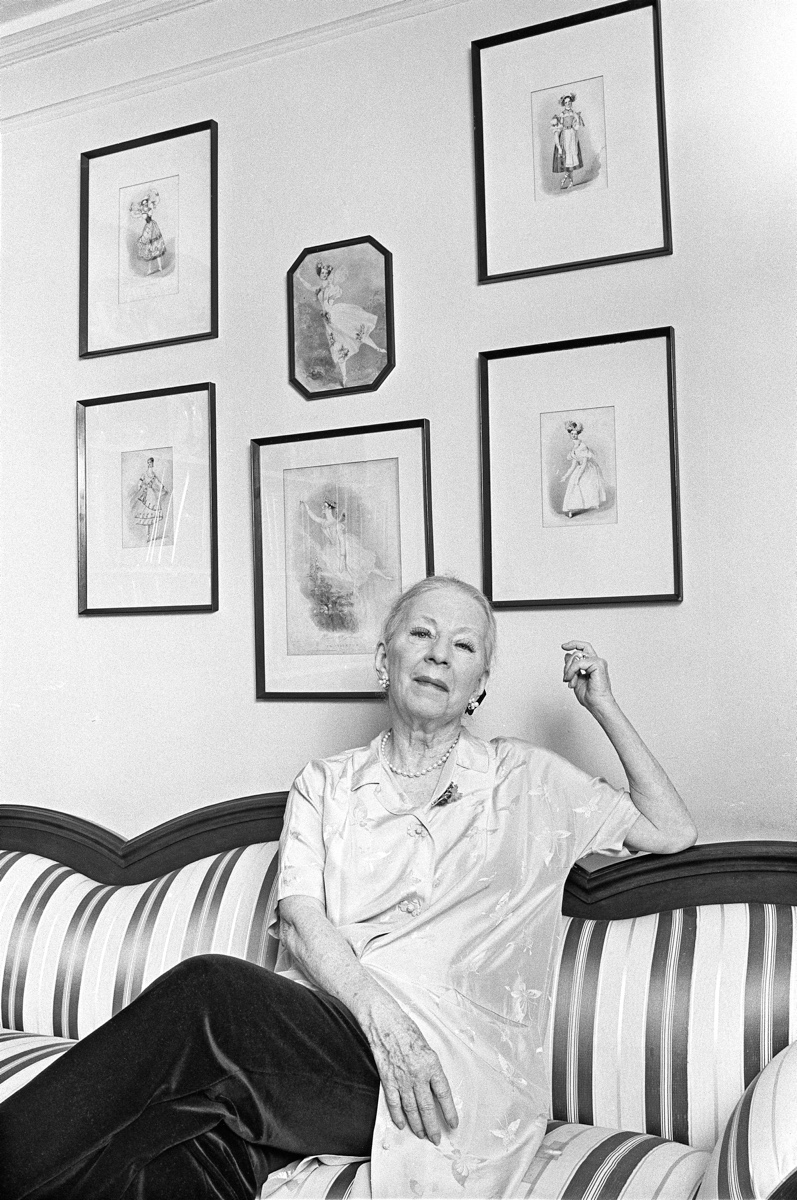
Agnes de Mille in her apartment in 1978 photographed by Lynn Gilbert

In 1973, de Mille founded the Agnes de Mille Dance Theatre, which she later revived as Heritage Dance Theatre.

De Mille developed a love for public speaking, becoming an outspoken advocate for dance in America. She spoke in front of Congress three times: once in the Senate, once in the House of Representatives, and once for the Committee for Medical Research.

She was interviewed in the television documentary series Hollywood: A Celebration of the American Silent Film (1980) primarily discussing the work of her uncle Cecil B. DeMille.

Agnes de Mille appears in a wheelchair in Frederick Wiseman's 1995 film Ballet rehearsing her final piece, "The Other." She tells her star "You must look like something that's absolutely broken, and stuck up in the wind."

== Writings ==
DeMille's 1951 memoir Dance to the Piper was translated into five languages. It was reissued in 2015 by New York Review Books.

De Mille was a lifelong friend of modern dance legend Martha Graham. De Mille, in 1992, published Martha: The Life and Work of Martha Graham, a biography of Graham that de Mille worked on for more than 30 years.

After suffering from a near-fatal stroke, she wrote five books: Reprieve (which outlined the experience), Who Was Henry George?, Where the Wings Grow, America Dances, Portrait Gallery, and Martha: The Life and Work of Martha Graham. She also wrote And Promenade Home, To a Young Dancer, The Book of Dance, Lizzie Borden: Dance of Death, Dance in America, Russian Journals, and Speak to Me, Dance with Me.

De Mille also wrote an introduction entitled "Anna George de Mille - A Note About the Author" to the book Henry George: Citizen of the World by Anna George de Mille (daughter of Henry George & Agnes' mother) which was published in 1950 by the University of North Carolina Press.

== Works ==
(source:)

- Dance to the Piper (1952)
- And Promenade Home (1956)
- To a Young Dancer (1962)
- The Book of Dance (1963)
- Lizzie Borden: Dance of Death (1968)
- Speak to Me, Dance with Me (1973)
- Where the Wings Grow (1978)
- America Dances (1980)
- Reprieve: A Memoir (1981)
- Portrait Gallery: Artists, Impresarios and Intimates (1990)
- Martha: The Life and Work of Martha Graham (1992)

== Personal life ==
De Mille married Walter Prude on June 14, 1943. They had one child, Jonathan, born in 1946.

Agnes de Mille donated her papers to the Sophia Smith Collection at Smith College "between 1959 and 1968, and her Dance To The Piper was purchased in 1994. Three films were donated by Lester Tome in 2010. The bulk of the papers date from 1914 to 1960 and focus on both personal and professional aspects of de Mille's life."

She suffered a stroke on stage in 1975, but recovered. She died in 1993 of a second stroke in her Greenwich Village apartment.

In a September 1979 issue of The New York Times, de Mille recalled the posthumous presence that her grandfather, the social philosopher and reformer Henry George, had on her and her growing up around her mother's single-tax activism:

He was an enormous presence. My mother was flaming with it. Mother taught Georgists. Every political economist who was in the city stopped in for tea. Karl Marx's daughter came. They stood like two she tigers — these daughters — facing each other. I was taken to my first Single Tax convention about the time of the Panama‐Pacific International Exposition in 1915 in San Francisco when I was a little girl, and had to listen to a lot of speeches. The next convention was in Denmark, and there were more speeches, in Danish and other foreign languages.

== Legacy ==
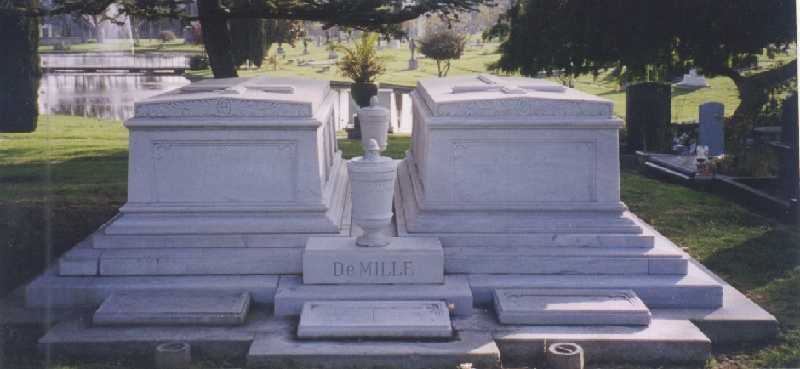
DeMille tomb at Hollywood Forever Cemetery

De Mille was inducted into the American Theater Hall of Fame in 1973. De Mille's many other awards include the Tony Award for Best Choreography (1947, for Brigadoon; 1962, for Kwamina), the Handel Medallion for achievement in the arts (1976), an honor from the Kennedy Center (1980), an Emmy for her work in The Indomitable de Mille (1980), Drama Desk Special Award (1986) and, in 1986, she was awarded the National Medal of Arts. De Mille also received seven honorary degrees from various colleges and universities. She was featured on a U.S. postage stamp in 2004.

At present, the only commercially available examples of de Mille's choreography are parts one and two of Rodeo by the American Ballet Theatre, Fall River Legend (filmed in 1989 by the Dance Theatre of Harlem) and Oklahoma!

The character of Agnes DeMille, played by Evie Templeton in the comedy-horror TV series Wednesday, shares her name with the choreographer and is also depicted as a skilled dancer in the series.
