= Brigadoon (1954 film) =

1954 film by Vincente Minnelli

- Theatrical release poster
- Directed by: Vincente Minnelli
- Screenplay by: Alan Jay Lerner
- Based on: Brigadoon by Alan Jay Lerner
- Produced by: Arthur Freed
- Starring: Gene Kelly; Van Johnson; Cyd Charisse; Elaine Stewart; Barry Jones; Albert Sharpe
- Cinematography: Joseph Ruttenberg
- Edited by: Albert Akst
- Music by: Frederick Loewe
- Production company: Metro-Goldwyn-Mayer
- Distributed by: Loew's Inc.
- Release dates: September 8, 1954 (Los Angeles); May 15, 1955 (United States)
- Running time: 108 minutes
- Country: United States
- Language: English
- Budget: $3,019,000
- Box office: $2.25 million (US)

Brigadoon is a 1954 American romantic musical fantasy film directed by Vincente Minnelli from a screenplay by Alan Jay Lerner, based on the 1947 Broadway musical by Lerner. The film stars Gene Kelly, Van Johnson, and Cyd Charisse, with Elaine Stewart, Barry Jones, and Albert Sharpe.

== Plot ==
Americans Tommy Albright and Jeff Douglas are on a hunting trip in Scotland and become lost in the woodlands. They happen upon Brigadoon, a miraculously blessed village that appears out of the mists every one hundred years for only a day. (This was done so that the village would never be changed or destroyed by the outside world.)

Tommy falls in love with village lass Fiona Campbell, whose younger sister Jean is about to be married to Charlie Dalrymple. When Tommy and Jeff discover clues about the village and its people that make no sense, Fiona takes them to see Mr. Lundie, the village schoolmaster, who tells them the story of Brigadoon and the miracle. If any villager ever leaves Brigadoon, the spell will be broken and the village will vanish forever. Furthermore, Lundie tells them, any outsider who wishes to stay must love someone in the village strongly enough to accept the loss of everything he or she knew in the outside world.

That evening, Mr. Lundie officiates at the wedding of Jean and Charlie, which Tommy and Fiona attend. Interrupting the wedding, the jealous Harry Beaton announces he is leaving Brigadoon to make everything disappear, since the girl he loves, Jean, is marrying another man. Harry's words cause mass chaos among the townspeople, and they all rush to stop him. Harry almost crosses the bridge but is stopped short by Tommy. They scuffle and Tommy is knocked unconscious. With men closing in on him, Harry climbs up a tree to hide but is accidentally gunned down by Jeff, who skipped the wedding to go hunting. Harry falls dead to the ground and is soon found by the men.

Fiona frantically searches for and finds Tommy. Confessing their love for each other, they decide to marry, allowing Tommy to stay in Brigadoon for good. But while Fiona goes off to find Mr. Lundie, Tommy tells Jeff about his plan. Jeff, drunk and remorseful for accidentally killing Harry, tells Tommy he can't just leave everything in the real world behind for this girl he's only known for one day. Fiona returns with Mr. Lundie, but Tommy confesses that he cannot stay. Fiona says she understands but is heartbroken, and they say good-bye before Brigadoon completely disappears. Tommy and Jeff cross the bridge and walk away.

Back in New York City, Tommy can think only of Fiona. Unable even to talk with his fiancée, Tommy ends his relationship with her and calls Jeff, telling him to get the first flight back to Scotland. He and Jeff return to the same spot where they were lost, though Jeff reminds him again the village will not be there. However, suddenly Tommy sees lights start to appear through the mist and runs toward them. Brigadoon reappears and Tommy gets to the foot of the bridge to see Mr. Lundie half-awake on the other side saying: "Tommy, lad, you! My, my, you must really love her. You woke me up." Tommy seems stunned that Brigadoon has been brought back, but Mr. Lundie reminds him: "I told ye, if you love someone deeply enough, anything is possible ... even miracles."

Tommy then runs across the bridge and reunites with Fiona as the village fades back into the mist.

== Cast ==
- Gene Kelly as Tommy Albright
- Van Johnson as Jeff Douglas
- Cyd Charisse as Fiona Campbell
- Elaine Stewart as Jane Ashton
- Barry Jones as Mr. Lundie
- Hugh Laing as Harry Beaton
- Albert Sharpe as Andrew Campbell
- Virginia Bosler as Jean Campbell
- Eddie Quillan as Sandy
- Jimmy Thompson as Charlie Chisholm Dalrymple
- Tudor Owen as Archie Beaton
- Owen McGiveney as Angus
- Dee Turnell as Ann
- Dodie Heath as Meg Brockie (as Dody Heath)

== Production ==
Producer J. Arthur Rank acquired the rights of the official play in February 1951. According to the press, Metro-Goldwyn-Mayer "paid a fortune" for the rights, and Gene Kelly and Kathryn Grayson were named as the leads a month later. At the time of their casting, a script had not been written yet, although it was reported that Alan Jay Lerner was expected to start writing a week later. Furthermore, Alec Guinness was also set for a role, and David Wayne, Moira Shearer, and Donald O'Connor were under consideration for others. Judy Garland was attached to the film at one point during production.

According to the film's director, Vincente Minnelli, O'Connor competed with Steve Allen and Bill Hayes for the role of Jeff. Cyd Charisse replaced Grayson in March 1953. Elaine Stewart was cast in the fourth lead in November 1953, and it was reported that she was more enthusiastic about working with Minnelli than with Kelly.

Because of Kelly's commitments to other film projects, production was delayed for a while and did not begin until 1953. Initially, Minnelli and Kelly wanted to film on location in Scotland. An unpredictable climate and higher location production costs (the latter not compatible with MGM President Dore Schary's thriftiness) forced them to change course. Kelly and producer Arthur Freed traveled to Scotland to confirm for themselves if the weather was too unreliable, and they agreed with the studio. In Kelly's biography, it was stated that "the weather was so bad that we had to agree with the studio. So we came back to the United States and started looking for locations here. We found some highlands above Monterey [in Big Sur] that looked like Scotland. But then the studio had an economy wave, and they clamped the lid on that idea." Much to the disappointment of the cast and crew and to the delight of Dore Schary, filming had to take place on the sound stages at MGM instead.

Dancer-actor James Mitchell had originated the part of Harry Beaton in the original 1947 Broadway production of Brigadoon and scored a great success. When the film began shooting in 1953, Mitchell was already under contract to Metro-Goldwyn-Mayer and had just completed work on the Fred Astaire musical film The Band Wagon, which was also directed by Vincente Minnelli and co-starred Cyd Charisse. However, rather than have Mitchell reprise his stage role, the studio instead cast New York City Ballet dancer Hugh Laing as Harry Beaton. In December 1954, a few months after the release of Brigadoon, Mitchell and Charisse made a cameo appearance dancing with each other to the song "One Alone" in the M-G-M Sigmund Romberg musical biography film Deep in My Heart.

In addition, rather than being filmed in the expensive original three-strip Technicolor process with the 1.33:1 square-frame aspect ratio, the film was shot in single-strip Metrocolor and utilized CinemaScope, the newly patented 20th Century Fox 2.55:1 anamorphic widescreen process.

== Musical numbers ==
1. "Once in the Highlands/Brigadoon/Down on MacConnachy Square" – Eddie Quillan, Villagers, and Offscreen M-G-M Chorus
2. "Waiting for My Dearie" – Cyd Charisse (dubbed by Carol Richards) and Dee Turnell (dubbed by Bonnie Murray)
3. "I'll Go Home with Bonnie Jean" – Jimmy Thompson (dubbed by John Gustafson), Gene Kelly, Van Johnson, and Chorus
4. "The Heather on the Hill" – Gene Kelly, Danced by Gene Kelly and Cyd Charisse
5. "Almost Like Being in Love" – Sung and Danced by Gene Kelly
6. "The Wedding Dance" – Danced by Jimmy Thompson and Virginia Bosler
7. "The Chase" – Sung by men pursuing Hugh Laing
8. "The Heather on the Hill" – Danced by Gene Kelly and Cyd Charisse
9. "I'll Go Home with Bonnie Jean" (reprise) – Sung offscreen by Jimmy Thompson, Carol Richards, and Chorus
10. "The Heather on the Hill" (reprise) – Sung offscreen by Jimmy Thompson, Carol Richards, and Chorus
11. "Waitin' for My Dearie" (reprise) – Sung offscreen by Jimmy Thompson, Carol Richards, and Chorus
12. "Finale: Brigadoon" – M-G-M Chorus

Complete sound and picture footage of three of the deleted musical numbers have survived, and they are included in the latest DVD release of the film.

The 1954 original motion picture soundtrack was originally incomplete but was re-released with deleted songs, alternative takes, and undubbed vocals.

== Reception ==
=== Box office ===
According to MGM records, Brigadoon earned $1,982,000 in the US and Canada and $1,293,000 and resulted in a loss of $1,555,000.

=== Critical response ===
Bosley Crowther of The New York Times described the film as "curiously flat and out-of-joint, rambling all over creation and seldom generating warmth or charm." He found fault with the film's two stars and its director: "the personable Gene Kelly and Cyd Charisse have the lead dancing roles. Even so, their several individual numbers are done too slickly, too mechanistically. What should be wistful and lyrical smacks strongly of trickery and style ... Mr. Kelly's [performance] is as thin and metallic as a nail; Miss Charisse's is solemn and posey ... Vincente Minnelli's direction lacks his usual vitality and flow." William Brogdon of Variety posted a lukewarm review, calling the dance staging "not particularly arresting, although a few of the numbers will have a desired effect on the audience, and the vocals fail to give the tunes the tonal impact needed to put them over."

Harrison's Reports wrote of the film: "It has much to recommend it from the viewpoint of the production values, and there are individual musical sequences that are nimble, gay, and cheery, but some of the other production numbers are long, drawn out, and tedious, and on the whole the picture's fantasy theme misfires." John McCarten of The New Yorker wrote: "There are times in this version of 'Brigadoon' when one is seized by the wild hope that the exposition of the town's dilemma will be quickly boiled down to an essence, so that Gene Kelly and Cyd Charisse can get on with their dancing. The problems of the community are always getting in the way though ... I rather regretted that they weren't able to cut loose with their musical paces more often." The Monthly Film Bulletin called the film "a sizeable disappointment. Overloaded with Hollywood-Scottish trappings, with tartans, bagpipes and a wedding celebration preceded by a miniature sort of gathering of the clans, the tenuous romantic fantasy is slackly developed ... and the whimsical dream-world it creates holds no compelling attractions."

In the 2009 edition of his Movie Guide, Leonard Maltin wrote, "Overlooked among 1950s musicals, it may lack innovations but it has a quiet charm and lovely score, including "The Heather on the Hill.""

On the review aggregator website Rotten Tomatoes, the film holds an approval rating of 75% based on 16 reviews.

=== Accolades ===
Award	Category	Nominee(s)	Result	Ref.
Academy Awards	Best Art Direction–Set Decoration (Color)	Cedric Gibbons, E. Preston Ames, Edwin B. Willis, F. Keogh Gleason	Nominated	
Academy Awards	Best Costume Design (Color)	Irene Sharaff	Nominated	
Academy Awards	Best Sound Recording	Wesley C. Miller	Nominated	
Golden Globe Awards	Best Cinematography, Color	Joseph Ruttenberg	Won	

== See also ==
- Schmigadoon!
