= Marion Bell =

American singer

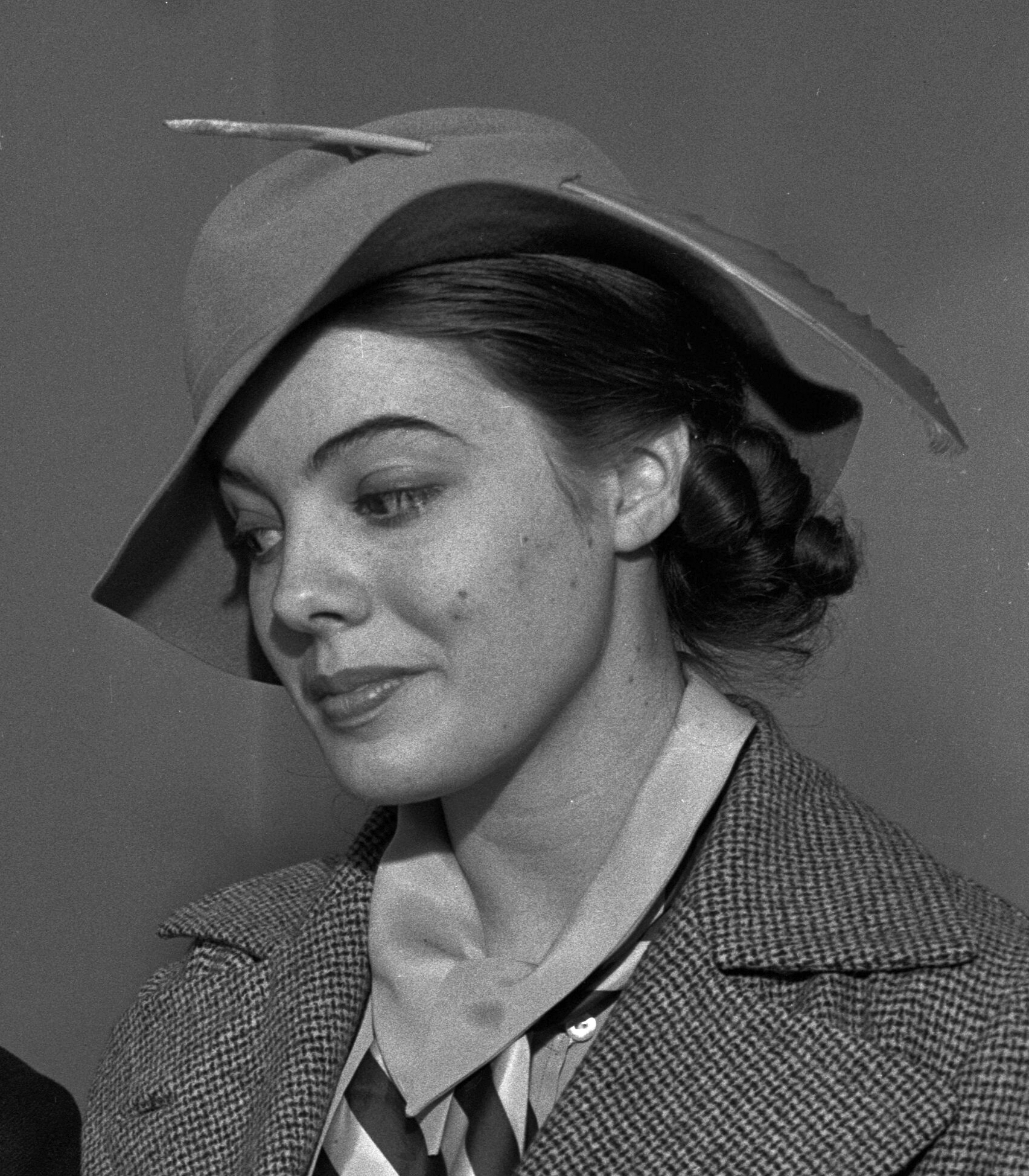
- Bell in 1935
- Born: November 16, 1919; St Louis, Missouri, U.S.
- Died: December 14, 1997 (aged 78); Culver City, California, U.S.
- Years active: 1935–1949
- Spouses: Jack Charles Hollimon (m. 1943) Alan Jay Lerner (m. 1947–1949) Thomas Charlesworth (m. 1951)
- Children: 1

Marion Lee Bell (November 16, 1919 – December 14, 1997) was an American singer and musical theatre performer best known for her role in the Broadway musical Brigadoon.

== Personal life ==
Bell was born in St. Louis. Her father was a freight agent on the Wabash Railroad. She had three sisters, Evelyn, Ruth, and Veronica. The family moved to California, and were established there by the time she was 15.

In 1947, she married the librettist Alan Jay Lerner. She was the second of his eight wives, and the only one not to come from a wealthy, socially well-placed family. The marriage lasted two years. Lerner left her six months after Brigadoon closed its first Broadway run. Her third husband was Tom Charlesworth, an actor and singer she met during a production of The Chocolate Soldier. That marriage lasted only three months, but the two had a son.

Bell was known for her "striking" appearance, and was described as "raven" haired, "big-bosomed and sexy," and "handsome to the eye."

== Early singing career ==
Bell began her career on local radio by the age of eight, singing with Ted Straeter's orchestra. A soprano, she studied opera in Rome for a year with Mario Marafioti, but returned to the United States as the Second World War loomed. Back in California, she studied with Nina Koshetz and sang leading roles with the San Francisco Opera Company, including the Shepherd in Wagner’s Tannhäuser and the young girl in Love of Three Kings by Montemezzi. She also sang at the now-defunct St. Louis Opera Company and the Opera Nacional in Mexico City.

== Film career ==
Her return to California led to Metro Goldwyn Mayer signing her to a film contract. Accounts of her discovery as a potential film star vary: her obituaries in the New York Times and Variety credited her signing to the director Robert Z. Leonard, who heard her sing at a party. Musical theatre historian Gene Lees noted that a talent scout had noticed her in one of her opera roles.

After signing with MGM at age 15, Bell toured with the Marx Brothers in their vaudeville show, and had a small uncredited role in their 1935 movie A Night at the Opera. In the stateroom scene, she pushes through the crowd to call "Aunt Minnie." In 1944, it was announced that she was to star in the screen operetta The Kissing Bandit with John Hodiak; produced by Joe Pasternak, this project came to fruition in 1949 without either Bell or Hodiak in the cast.

She sang a duet from La Traviata with James Melton in Ziegfeld Follies, which was completed in 1944 and considered her screen debut. Her MGM contract delayed her Broadway debut by preventing her from accepting a role in the Lerner-Loewe musical The Day Before Spring in 1945.

== Brigadoon and New York recital ==
When the Broadway musical Brigadoon was in production, Bell was appearing in summer stock. It was suggested that she audition. She traveled to New York City to do so, and there met Lerner for the first time. Bell won the role of Fiona. The reviewer Brooks Atkinson said that Bell and David Brooks had "sung rapturously" on "Almost Like Being in Love." Bell won the Donaldson Award for the best debut performance by an actress in a musical and a New York Drama Critics Circle Award. She sang on the original cast album of Brigadoon and made other recordings for RCA Victor such as Smash Hits of Broadway, released on four 10-inch disks and featuring songs from several Broadway musicals.

Bell had been interviewed by the New York World-Telegram during tryouts in Boston and intimated that she regarded the Broadway musical as a lesser artform than opera. While Brigadoon was enjoying its successful run, she gave a recital featuring the European art music she preferred. Lees conjectures that the New York Times review of her recital would have been painful, as it found her good enough for Broadway but insufficient for the classical repertoire. That review, signed only with the initials "N.S.," praised her "expert showmanship … which captivated the large and highly responsive audience" and her "enviable poise and an ability to project a song in a way to hold the attention not commonly encountered among newcomers on the concert stage." The reviewer, however, faulted her for bringing an "operetta type of singing" to the challenging pieces she programmed, which included works in six languages. The program included arias by Handel, Bach, Purcell and Mozart; Russian songs by Rachmaninoff, Rimsky-Korsakov and Tchaikovsky; "Seven Spanish Folk Songs" by de Falla; and the first performance of "La Bonne Cuisine" by Leonard Bernstein and "A Day Is Born" by Albert Hay Malotte. The reviewer found her "most at home" with the song "Somehow I Could Never Believe" from Street Scene by Kurt Weill. Bell's accompanist for the recital, which took place at the Town Hall performance venue, was Edwin McArthur.

The year Bell spent performing in Brigadoon, which ran for 581 shows over 18 months, was the extent of her Broadway career, although she was floated as the possible female lead for Kiss Me, Kate. During the war, Bell had entertained troops from the Normandy and Africa campaigns who were recovering at the hospital in Waco, Texas. There she contracted infectious hepatitis, but continued working contrary to her doctor's orders. Her hepatitis recurred during the run of Brigadoon and contributed to the mental exhaustion that caused her to withdraw from the show.

== Other performances ==
Courtesy of MGM, Bell helped entertain the troops in 1945 at Camp Roberts, California, performing with Joseph Sullivan in Naughty Marietta (operetta).

Bell sang in the world premiere of the folk opera Down in the Valley by Weill and Arnold Sundgaard for the Indiana University Opera Theatre in 1948. She appeared in the telecast production that aired January 1950 as the first show of the NBC Opera Theatre series. A review of mixed opinion signed "R.P." said that Bell "acted sincerely and sang appealingly." She sang on the RCA Victor recording of Down in the Valley, released on three 45 rpm disks.

In 1947 she was announced as one in a series of female guest singers on Gordon MacRae's summer series, Troubadour 1947, on CBS Radio.

During her mid-career, Bell also sang at the St. Louis Municipal Opera, the Los Angeles Civic Light Opera, and the Sacramento Music Circus. In 1951, she was performing in Three Wishes for Jamie with John Raitt and Cecil Kellaway, a production tried out at the Los Angeles Philharmonic Auditorium and then moved to the Curran Theatre in San Francisco. She sang in more than 200 concerts during her career.

== Later life ==
In an interview, Bell said that Lerner's interest in her waned as he left Brigadoon behind for his next project. She retreated from the relationship, and her fame declined. She spent much of the next decade hospitalized for mental illness. In 1960, she returned to California, where her parents still lived. There she supported her son with the help of her parents and by working at various jobs.

In the late 1990s, Bell provided archival film of her Town Hall recital for "Classic Arts Showcase" television, of which she was said to be a regular viewer.

In 1990, Lees visited Bell in Culver City, where she still lived with her father. She had cancer, which was in remission due to chemotherapy, and earned a living giving voice lessons. Although she had alleged cruelty as grounds for divorce from Lerner, Lees remarked that she was "remarkably free of bitterness," and Bell said she had never stopped loving him.

Bell spent the last 15 years of her life in Culver City, where she was involved with local light opera and community activities. She died in 1997.
