= Brigadoon =

Musical by Frederick Loewe and Alan Jay Lerner

- Cover of original cast recording
- Music: Frederick Loewe
- Lyrics: Alan Jay Lerner
- Book: Alan Jay Lerner
- Productions: 1947 Broadway; 1949 West End; 1957 Broadway revival; 1963 Broadway revival; 1980 Broadway revival; 1988 West End; 1992 U.S. tour; 2017 New York City Centre Concert; 2025 London Revival

Brigadoon is a musical with book and lyrics by Alan Jay Lerner and score by Frederick Loewe. The plot features two American men who stumble upon Brigadoon, a mysterious Scottish village that appears for only one day every 100 years; one man soon falls in love with a young woman from Brigadoon. The show's song "Almost Like Being in Love" subsequently became a standard.

The original production opened at the Ziegfeld Theatre on Broadway in 1947 and ran for 581 performances, starring David Brooks, Marion Bell, Pamela Britton, and Lee Sullivan. Brigadoon opened at Her Majesty's Theatre in the West End in 1949 and ran for 685 performances; many revivals have followed. The 1954 film adaptation starred Gene Kelly and Cyd Charisse, while the 1966 television version starred Robert Goulet, Sally Ann Howes, and Peter Falk.

== Background ==
Lyricist and book writer Alan Jay Lerner and composer Frederick Loewe had previously collaborated on three musicals: the first, Life of the Party, closed during pre-Broadway tryouts, and the second and third, What's Up? and The Day Before Spring, met with moderate success. Inspired by Rodgers and Hammerstein's innovative collaborations on Oklahoma! (1943) and Carousel (1945), they created Brigadoon, about a magical village in the Scottish highlands.

Like Oklahoma! and Carousel, Brigadoon included a serious love story as the main plot and a lighter romance as subplot. Thematically, the musical depicted the contrast between empty city life and the warmth and simplicity of the country, focusing on a theme of love transcending time. Agnes de Mille, who had previously choreographed Oklahoma! and Carousel, was hired as choreographer, and her work for Brigadoon incorporated elements of traditional Scottish folk dance: a traditional sword dance, a chase scene, and a funeral dance.

Although Lerner and Loewe originally took Brigadoon to producer Billy Rose, Cheryl Crawford was the producer who actually brought Brigadoon to Broadway. Lerner explained the change in producer by saying: "The contract which [Billy Rose] wished us to sign negated Abraham Lincoln's Emancipation Proclamation that freed the slaves." Under Loewe's guidance, Ted Royal received a sole orchestrator credit for his work on the original production. His atmospheric arrangements have been frequently used for the revivals.

Though the Highland village of Brigadoon is fictional, it is named after the (Lowland) Brig o' Doon, a bridge located south of Alloway, Ayrshire, Scotland, which is the setting for the final verse of Robert Burns's poem "Tam o' Shanter".

The New York Times's theatre critic George Jean Nathan wrote that Lerner's book was based on a German story, published in 1860 by Friedrich Gerstäcker, later translated by Charles Brandon Schaeffer, about the mythical village of Germelshausen that fell under a magic curse. However, Lerner denied that he had based the book on an older story, and, in an explanation published in The New York Times, stated that he did not learn of the existence of the Germelshausen story until after he had completed the first draft of Brigadoon. Lerner said that in his subsequent research, he found many other legends of disappearing towns in various countries' folklore, and he pronounced their similarities "unconscious coincidence".

== Plot ==
=== Act I ===
New Yorkers Tommy Albright and Jeff Douglas have travelled to the Scottish Highlands on a game-hunting vacation, but they get lost on their first night out. They begin to hear music ("Brigadoon") coming from a nearby village that does not appear on their map of the area. They head over there to get directions back to their inn and find a fair in progress ("McConnachy Square"), with villagers dressed in traditional Scottish tartan. Andrew MacLaren and his daughters arrive at the fair to purchase supplies for younger daughter Jean's wedding to Charlie Dalrymple. Archie Beaton's son Harry madly loves Jean and is depressed at the thought of her marrying another, unable to find comfort in Maggie Anderson's devotion to him. One of the girls asks Jean's older sister Fiona when she'll marry, and Fiona answers she's waiting for the right person ("Waitin' for My Dearie").

Tommy and Jeff wander into the village and ask where they are; Archie informs them that they are in "Brigadoon". Fiona invites the wanderers to have a meal and rest at the MacLaren home. Flirtatious dairymaid Meg Brockie immediately falls for Jeff and leads him off. Charlie Dalrymple appears, rejoicing in his impending nuptials. He shares a drink with Tommy, toasting to a Mr. Forsythe whom he thanks for "postponing the miracle". When Tommy asks what that means, Fiona shushes him and leads him away as Charlie celebrates the end of his bachelorhood ("Go Home with Bonnie Jean"). Tommy tells Fiona that he has a fiancée, Jane, in New York, but he's in no hurry to marry her, and Fiona reveals that she likes Tommy very much. Tommy insists on accompanying Fiona to gather heather for the wedding ("The Heather on the Hill"). Meanwhile, Meg takes Jeff to a place in the forest with a shack and a cot. She tells him she's "highly attracted" to him, but he spurns her advances, wanting only to sleep. She reflects on her "eventful" love life ("The Love of My Life").

At the MacLarens', Jean's friends help her pack her things to move into Charlie's home ("Jeannie's Packin' Up"). Charlie arrives to sign the MacLarens' family Bible. He wants to see Jean; told that it's bad luck to see her on the wedding day, he begs for her to come out anyway ("Come to Me, Bend to Me"). Tommy and Fiona return with a basket full of heather, and Fiona goes upstairs to help Jean dress for the wedding. Jeff arrives wearing a pair of Highland trews (trousers); apparently his own pants have been damaged on a "thistle". Jeff finds that Tommy is so happy that he can barely contain it ("Almost Like Being in Love"). Tommy notices that all the events listed in the family Bible, including Jean's wedding, are listed as if they had happened 200 years earlier. When he asks Fiona about this, she sends him to the schoolmaster, Mr. Lundie.

Fiona, Tommy, and Jeff arrive at Mr. Lundie's home, where he relates a story that the two New Yorkers can hardly believe: to protect Brigadoon from being changed by the outside world, 200 years ago the local minister prayed to God to have Brigadoon disappear, only to reappear for one day every 100 years. All citizens of Brigadoon are forbidden to leave the town, or it will disappear forever. Tommy asks hypothetically if an outsider could be permitted to stay. Mr. Lundie replies, "A stranger can stay if he loves someone here – not jus' Brigadoon, mind ye, but someone in Brigadoon – enough to want to give up everythin' an' stay with that one person. Which is how it should be. 'Cause after all, lad, if ye love someone deeply, anythin' is possible."

The group leaves to go to the wedding, which opens with the clans coming in from the hills. Mr. Lundie marries Charlie and Jean, and they perform a traditional celebratory wedding dance. Sword dancers appear, led by Harry, and they perform an elaborate dance over their weapons. All the town joins in the dance, but it abruptly halts when Jean screams as Harry tries to kiss her. In anguish over Jean's wedding, he announces that he's leaving the town (which would end the miracle, causing Brigadoon to disappear forever into the Highland mists) and sprints away.

=== Act II ===
The men of the town, including Tommy and a reluctant Jeff, frantically try to find Harry before he can depart the town ("The Chase"). Suddenly an agonized scream is heard. Harry, who appears to have fallen on a rock and crushed his skull, is found dead by the other men. Deciding not to tell the rest of the town until the next morning, the men carry Harry's body away. Fiona and her father arrive to see if everything is all right. As Mr. MacLaren leaves, Tommy sees Fiona, and they embrace. She reveals her love for him, and he tells her he believes he feels the same way ("There But For You Go I"). Fiona reminds him that the end of the day is near, and Tommy tells her he wants to stay in Brigadoon with her. They go to find Mr. Lundie.

Meanwhile, in the village, Meg tells about the day her parents were drunkenly married ("My Mother's Wedding Day"), and the townsfolk dance until the sound of Highland pipes pierces the air. The gaiety is interrupted as Archie Beaton enters carrying Harry's body, led by the pipers playing a lament. Maggie, who loved Harry, performs a funeral dance for her unrequited love. The men of Brigadoon help Archie carry his son to the burial place.

Tommy finds Jeff and announces his intention to stay. Jeff thinks the idea is absurd and argues with Tommy until he has convinced him that Brigadoon is only a dream. Jeff also reveals that he tripped Harry and accidentally killed him. Fiona and Mr. Lundie arrive, and Tommy, shaken by Jeff's confession, tells Fiona that he loves her, but he can't stay; he still has doubts ("From This Day On"). Fiona tells Tommy, as she fades away into darkness, that she will love him forever.

Four months later, Jeff is drinking heavily at a hotel bar in New York. Tommy, who has been living on a farm in New Hampshire, enters and greets Jeff, but is still in love with Fiona and cannot stop thinking about her. His fiancée Jane Ashton, a beautiful socialite, talks to him about their impending wedding, but everything she says causes him to hear Fiona's voice and dream of Brigadoon ("Come to Me, Bend to Me" (reprise) and "Heather on the Hill" (reprise)). Tommy tells Jane that he cannot marry her, and she argues with him, but he continues to daydream about his true love ("Go Home With Bonnie Jean" (reprise) and "From This Day On" (reprise)). Jane leaves, and Tommy tells Jeff that he wants to return to Scotland, although he knows the village will not be there.

The pair return to the spot where they found Brigadoon and, as they expected, see nothing there. Just as they turn to leave, they hear the music again ("Brigadoon"), and Mr. Lundie appears and says, "My my! You must really love her. You woke me up!" Tommy waves goodbye to Jeff and disappears with Mr. Lundie into the Highland mist to be reunited with Fiona.

== Musical numbers ==
Act I

- Introduction
- Prologue (Once in the Highlands) – Ensemble
- Brigadoon – Ensemble
- Vendors' Calls – Ensemble
- Down on MacConnachy Square – Ensemble
- Waitin' for My Dearie – Fiona and Girls
- I'll Go Home with Bonnie Jean – Charlie and Ensemble
- Dance – Charlie and Ensemble
- The Heather on the Hill – Tommy and Fiona
- Rain Exorcism †
- The Love of My Life – Meg Brockie
- Jeannie's Packin' Up – Girls
- Come to Me, Bend to Me – Charlie
- Dance – Jean and Girls
- Almost Like Being in Love – Tommy and Fiona
- Bible Scene – Tommy and Jeff
- Entrance of the Clans/Wedding Ceremony ‡ Ensemble
- Wedding Dance/The Sword Dance and Reel ‡ Harry and Ensemble

Act II

- The Chase – Ensemble
- There But for You Go I – Tommy
- Steps Stately †
- Drunken Reel †
- Glen Scene Opening/My Mother's Wedding Day – Meg and Ensemble
- Dance – Ensemble
- Funeral (Traditional Piobrochead) – Maggie
- From This Day On – Tommy and Fiona
- Farewell Music
- Reprises: Come to Me, Bend to Me / The Heather on the Hill / I'll Go Home with Bonnie Jean / From This Day On / Down on MacConnachy Square
- Finale (Brigadoon) – Ensemble

† Added in 1980 revival
‡ Moved to Act II in 1980 revival

== Productions ==
After initial shakedown runs in New Haven (starting February 6) and Boston (starting on February 10), the show opened in Philadelphia pre-Broadway (tryout) at the Forrest Theatre on February 24, 1947, for a final two weeks. The original Broadway production, directed by Robert Lewis and choreographed by Agnes de Mille, opened March 13, 1947, at the Ziegfeld Theatre, where it ran for 581 performances. It starred David Brooks as Tommy, George Keane as Jeff, Marion Bell as Fiona, Lee Sullivan as Charlie, Virginia Bosler as Jeannie, James Mitchell as Harry, and Pamela Britton as Meg. The concertmistress of the orchestra was noted American violinist Joan Field. De Mille won the Tony Award for Best Choreography, and Bell and Mitchell won the Theatre World Award. The show returned to Philadelphia post-Broadway at the Shubert Theatre on Monday, September 6, 1948, for two weeks. The production then enjoyed an extended North American tour.

The musical's original West End production opened on April 14, 1949, at Her Majesty's Theatre, running for 685 performances. It starred Philip Hanna as Tommy, Patricia Hughes as Fiona, James Jamieson as Harry, and Noele Gordon as Meg. Bruce Trent took the leading role in 1949 at His Majesty's Theatre. Two telegrams, one from impresario Emile Littler and another where the signature is difficult to identify, to Bruce Trent are dated February 24, 1949.

David Brooks reprised his role of Tommy in the Summertime Light Opera's production in Houston, Texas in 1950, with Gregg Juarez as Jeff and Dorothy MacNeil of the New York City Opera as Fiona. Stage direction was by John Brownlee, principal baritone of the Metropolitan Opera, and the musical director and conductor was Frederick Fennell of the Rochester Eastman Kodak Symphony.

The musical was revived at New York City Center in May 1950. It was revived on Broadway seven years later, directed by George H. Englund and choreographed by De Mille, opening on April 15, 1957, at the Adelphi Theatre, where it ran for 24 performances. The cast included David Atkinson, Helen Gallagher, Patricia Birch, and Marilyn Cooper. Another Broadway revival, directed by John Fearnley and choreographed by De Mille, opened on January 30, 1963, at New York City Center, where it ran for 16 performances. The cast included Peter Palmer, Russell Nype, Sally Ann Howes, and Edward Villella. It was Tony-nominated for Best Actress in a Musical (Howes), Best Direction of a Musical, and Best Conductor and Musical Director.

The next Broadway revival, directed by Vivian Matalon and choreographed by De Mille, opened on October 16, 1980, at the Majestic Theatre, where it ran for 133 performances and eight previews. The cast included Meg Bussert, Martin Vidnovic, and John Curry. Vidnovic received Tony and Drama Desk Award nominations, Bussert earned a Tony nomination and won the Theatre World Award, and the production was Tony-nominated for Best Reproduction.

New York City Opera staged the musical in 1986 and 1991.

The musical was revived in the West End at the Victoria Palace Theatre, opening on October 25, 1988, and closing August 5, 1989, starring Robert Meadmore (Tommy), Jacinta Mulcahy, and Lesley Mackie. The director was Roger Redfarn and de Mille's dances were rechoreographed by Tommy Shaw. The Times reviewer noted that those dances were "the main source of the magic".

In 2014, a major revival was staged at the Goodman Theater in Chicago. Directed and choreographed by Rachel Rockwell, with a revised book by Brian Hill, Charles Isherwood of The New York Times called the production "a first-class revival that boasts an infectious buoyancy of spirit and a welcome absence of postmodern flourishes". This version with the revised book by Hill was staged at the Shaw Festival in 2019.

The 2017 Melbourne production by The Production Company at the State Theatre, with Rohan Browne, Genevive Kingsford and Nancye Hayes and directed by Jason Langley, updated the setting of the world outside Brigadoon to contemporary times.

A staged concert was presented at New York City Center from November 15 to 19, 2017, with Stephanie J. Block as Meg Brockie, Aasif Mandvi as Jeff Douglas, Kelli O'Hara as Fiona and Patrick Wilson as Tommy Albright. It was directed and choreographed by Christopher Wheeldon. Reviews for this production were uniformly positive.

A major new London revival directed by Drew McOnie was staged at Regents Park Open Air Theatre, from August 2, 2025 to September 20, 2025. A new adaptation by leading Scottish playwright Rona Munro, it featured a change of period to World War II. The cast included, Danielle Fiamanya as Fiona, Louis Gaunt as Tommy, and Gilli Jonesas as Charlie Dalrymple & Jasmine Jules Andrews as Jean MacLaren.

== Characters and original cast ==
Character	Broadway	West End	Broadway Revival	Broadway Revival	Broadway Revival	Broadway Revival	West End Revival	U.S. National Tour	Off-Broadway Revival	Chicago	Melbourne	Off-Broadway Revival	London Revival
Character	1947	1949	1950	1957	1963	1980	1988	1992	2010	2014	2017		2025
Tommy Albright	David Brooks	Philip Hanna	Philip Hanna	David Atkinson	Peter Palmer	Martin Vidnovic	Robert Meadmore	John Schneider	Jason Danieley	Kevin Earley	Rohan Browne	Patrick Wilson	Louis Gaunt
Fiona MacLaren	Marion Bell	Patricia Hughes	Virginia Oswald	Virginia Oswald	Sally Ann Howes	Meg Bussert	(as Fiona MacKeith) Jacinta Mulachy	Elizabeth Walsh	Melissa Errico	Jennie Sophia	Genevive Kingsford	Kelli O'Hara	Danielle Fiamanya
Jeff Douglas	George Keane	Hiram Sherman	Peter Turgeon	Scott McKay	Russell Nype	Mark Zimmerman	Robin Nedwell	Mark Zimmerman	Don Stephenson	Rod Thomas	Luke Joslin	Aasif Mandvi	Cavan Clarke
Harry Beaton	James Mitchell	James Jamieson	Elliot Sullivan	Matt Mattox	Edward Villella	John Curry	(as Harry Ritchie) Ian MacKenzie Stewart	Angelo Fraboni	Ciarán Sheehan	Rhett Guter	Joel Granger	Robert Fairchild	Danny Nattress
Meg Brockie	Pamela Britton	Noele Gordon	Susan Johnson	Helen Gallagher	Anne Fraser	Elaine Hausman	Lesley Mackie	Jennifer Allen	Christine Ebersole	Maggie Portman	Elise McCann	Stephanie J. Block	Nic Myers
Charlie Dalrymple	Lee Sullivan	Bill O'Connor	Jeffrey Warren	Robert Rounseville	Harry Snow	Stephen Lehew	(as Charlie Cameron) Maurice Clarke	John Clonts	A. J. Shively	Jordan Brown	Matthew Manahan	Ross Lekites	Gilli Jones
Mr. Lundie	William Hansen	Ivor Barnard	Fred Stewart	John C. Becher	John C. Becher	Frank Hamilton	(as Mr. Murdoch) Leonard Maguire	John Newton	Len Cariou	Roger Mueller	(as Mrs. Forsythe) Nancye Hayes	Dakin Matthews	(as Lundie) Anne Lacey
Andrew MacLaren	Edward Cullen	Roy Russell	Donald McKee	Russell Gaige	Frank Milan	Jack Dabdoub	(as Andrew MacKeith) Fraser Kerr	Michael Mulheren	Jim Brochu	Craig Spidle	?	Rich Hebert	Edward Baruwa
Jean MacLaren	Virginia Bosler	Bunty Kelley	Ann Deasy	Virginia Bosler	Virginia Bosler	Mollie Smith	(as Jean MacKeith) Jo-Anne Sale	Antonia Franceschi	Bonnie Fraser	Olivia Renteria	Stefanie Jones	Sara Esty	Jasmine Jules Andrews
Angus McGuffie	Walter Scheff	Peter Dyneley	Angus Cairns	Guy Gurdon	Daniel P. Hannafin	Kenneth Kantor	(as Angus McMonies) David McEwan	David Bryant	Christopher Lynn	Michael Aaron Linder	Nelson Gardner	David Scott Purdy	David Colvin
Archie Beaton	Elliot Sullivan	John Rea	Thaddeus Clancy	Elliot Sullivan	John Carver	Casper Roos	(as Donald Ritchie) Jamie Miller-Coburn	John Wilkerson	Gordon Stanley	Joseph Foronda	Stephen Hall	Jamie Jackson	Norman Bowman
Jane Ashton	Frances Charles	Janet MacFarlane	Winifred Ainslee	Sloan Simpson	Kelly Stevens	Betsy Craig	Carrie Ellis	Beth Zumann	Kerry Conte	Emily Rohm	?	Madison Stratton	?
Maggie Anderson	Lidija Franklin	Noelle de Mosa	?	Lidija Franklin	Jenny Workman	Marina Eglevsky	(as Maggie Abernathy) Sorkina Tate	Camille de Ganon	?	Katie Spelman	Karla Tonkich	Patricia Delgado	?
Frank	John Paul	Freddie Costello	?	Jack Emrek	Felice Orlandi	Mark Herrier	Tony Stansfield	Mark Ankeny	?	Richard Strimer	(as Frankie) Emma Clark	Nicholas Ward	?
Sandy Dean	Jeffrey Warren	Wilfred Johns	Douglas Rideout	John Dorrin	William Kennedy	Michael Cone	Scott Davies	Larry Parrish	?	George Keating	Jensen Overend	Peyton Crim	Liam Wrate

== Adaptations ==
=== Film ===
A Cinemascope film version of Brigadoon, directed by Vincente Minnelli, was released by MGM in 1954 with Gene Kelly, Van Johnson, and Cyd Charisse in leading roles.

=== Television ===
On October 15, 1966, a television film version was broadcast on ABC. This version won five Primetime Emmy Awards.

The 1966 television version used a modernized, abbreviated script that accommodated much more of the score than the 1954 film version had, though the entire production ran only ninety minutes with commercials. "My Mother's Wedding Day" was restored to this version, though "Once in the Highlands", "Jeannie's Packin' Up", and "The Love of My Life" were still absent. In this version, Tommy and Jeff were participating in an auto race when their car stalled just outside Brigadoon.

The TV film starred Robert Goulet as Tommy, Peter Falk as Jeff, and Sally Ann Howes as Fiona. Also appearing were Finlay Currie, in one of his last roles, as Mr. Lundie, Edward Villella as Harry Beaton, and Marlyn Mason as Meg. The TV film was directed by Fielder Cook.

The 1966 telecast of Brigadoon has not been shown since its 1968 rebroadcast, nor has it ever been released on videocassette or DVD. It may, however, be viewed on the Internet Archive and on YouTube. In addition, the soundtrack of this TV adaptation was released by Columbia Records (under its "Columbia Special Products" banner) on the same year as the original broadcast.

=== Schmigadoon! ===
Schmigadoon! is a musical comedy television series which premiered on Apple TV+ on July 16, 2021. The series title indicates an ironic take on Brigadoon, while the premise offers an update of the classic plot.

== Reception ==
Brigadoon opened to unanimously positive reviews, one of only eight musicals that opened on Broadway between 1943 and 1964 to do so. Critics praised it for its originality and for integration of song and story, though some critics had minor points of criticism.

Brooks Atkinson of The New York Times praised the musical's integration, saying: "For once, the modest label 'musical play' has a precise meaning. For it is impossible to say where the music and dancing leave off and the story begins. Under Bob Lewis's direction all the arts of the theatre have been woven into a singing pattern of enchantment". Atkinson also emphasized Agnes de Mille's contributions as choreographer: "Some of the dances are merely illustrations for the music. One or two of them are conventional, if lovely, maiden round dances. But some of them, like the desperate chase in the forest, are fiercely dramatic. The funeral dance to the dour tune of bagpipes brings the footstep of doom into the forest. And the sword dance, done magnificently by James Mitchell, is tremendously exciting with its stylization of primitive ideas".

Robert Coleman of the New York Daily Mirror said: "It took courage to produce Brigadoon, an unconventional musical show of marked originality... [that] still manages to pack a tartan full of popular appeal". In the New York Herald Tribune, Howard Barnes pronounced Brigadoon: "A bonny thing for Broadway, a scintillating song and dance fantasy that has given theatregoers reason to toss tamoshanters in air". Robert Garland of the New York Journal American particularly praised Pamela Britton as Meg Brockie: "Pamela Britton escaped from both M.G.M. and Frank Sinatra in time to be tough as a Scottish temptress, and rough as a singer of raffish songs". He also opined that Russian choreographer George Balanchine should watch Brigadoon to learn how a musical should be choreographed. Ward Morehouse of The New York Sun deemed it "A stunning show", saying: "It has whimsy, beguiling music, exciting dancing – and it has a book.... Brigadoon is by far the best musical play the season has produced, and it is certainly one of the best within my entire play-going experience".

John Chapman of the Daily News enjoyed the dances but thought there were too many and that they interrupted the story: "Just when I get pleasantly steamed up about the love of Mr. Brooks and Miss Bell, I don't want to be cooled off by watching a herd of gazelles from Chorus Equity running around". He particularly praised William Hansen's performance as Mr. Lundie, declaring that he "is so irresistibly able to persuade you that if there isn't a village named Brigadoon, there ought to be".

Louis Kronenberger of PM said: "the musical fantasy [Brigadoon] not only has charm; it shows a good deal of independence... its charm must lie less in any story it tells than in the general mood it creates; and it has created that mood by fusing a number of theatre elements as densely as possible". Kronenberger, however, disliked the ending, calling it "an outright blunder" done "in the corniest Broadway fashion".

Richard Watts Jr. of the New York Post wrote: "I have seen other musical comedies that I enjoyed more, but few for which I have a deeper admiration". He opined that Lerner and Loewe's score for The Day Before Spring the previous year was better than theirs for Brigadoon, explaining that: "If my first emotion last night was admiration rather than sheer enjoyment, it was because the proceedings seemed to me more marked by taste and style than by emotional warmth in book and music, but there is no denying that the authors have matured as theatrical craftsmen".

Brigadoon was awarded the New York Drama Critics' Circle Award for Best Musical for the 1946–1947 season.

== Recordings ==
The following list of recordings is based on John Kenrick's discography for the site Musicals 101.

- 1947 Original Broadway cast recording (incomplete, due to recording limitations of the period; some lyrics were censored)
- 1954 Original motion picture soundtrack (originally incomplete, but re-released on CD with deleted songs, alternate takes, and undubbed vocals)
- 1957 studio cast recording (starring Shirley Jones and Jack Cassidy, with Frank Porretta and Susan Johnson).
- 1959 studio cast recording (starring Robert Merrill, Jan Peerce, and Jane Powell)
- 1966 Television cast recording (starring Sally Ann Howes, Robert Goulet, and Peter Falk)
- 1988 London revival cast recording (starring Robert Meadmore; some character names and dates were altered to make the show more historically accurate)
- 1991 Studio cast recording (starring Rebecca Luker and Brent Barrett, Judy Kaye, and Gregory Jbara)
- 2017 New York City Center recording (starring Kelli O'Hara and Patrick Wilson)

== In media ==
- Brigadoon is mentioned in the 1985 song "The Whole of the Moon" by Scottish band The Waterboys.
- 1987 episode of the Adventures of the Gummi Bears "The Knights of Gummadoon" is about a Castle full of Gummi bears that only appear for 1 night every 100 years, and is based on Brigadoon.
- The Star Trek: Deep Space Nine episode "Meridian" is about a planet that periodically disappears, and is based on Brigadoon. The Orville episode "Mad Idolatry" and the Star Trek: Lower Decks episode "The Stars at Night" also feature planets that periodically disappear. In "The Stars at Night", a character refers to the planet as "one of those Brigadoon-type planets".
- In Four Weddings and a Funeral, Gareth (Simon Callow) sees a Highland-themed dance party break out and exclaims in delight "It's bloody Brigadoon" as he grabs his partner and joins in the revelry.
- In the novel Witches of East End, the eponymous town is referred to as Brigadoon, as it is hidden by a power spell that makes it hard to find.
- In the '"Drew's Inheritance" episode of The Drew Carey Show, Drew's father, giving his son advice before a wedding, tells him not to bother looking for his future wife's G-spot because "it's like Brigadoon, you know." Drew quickly corrects him.
- In the video game Dragon Quest IX, within the Scottish inspired areas of Stornway and Zere is a destroyed town named Brigadoom, in reference to the musical.
- In season 5 episode 17 of Angel_(1999_TV_series), the character Eve makes reference, saying (sarcastically) "What do you want me to say? I'm a leprechaun. I'm from Brigadoon!"

== Sources ==
- Bloom, Ken; Vlastnik, Frank (2004). Broadway Musicals: The 101 Greatest Shows of all Time. New York: Black Dog & Leventhal Publishers. ISBN 1-57912-390-2.
- Stempel, Larry (2010). Showtime: A History of the Broadway Musical Theatre. New York: W.W. Norton & Company. ISBN 978-0-393-92906-5.
- Suskin, Stephen (1990). Opening Night on Broadway: A Critical Quotebook of the Golden Era of the Musical Theatre. New York: Schrimmer Books. ISBN 0-02-872625-1.
- Atkinson, Brooks, "Brigadoon", Broadway Scrapbook, Theatre Arts, Inc., New York, 1947. pp. 284–287.
