= Virginia Bosler =

American actress and dancer (1926–2020)

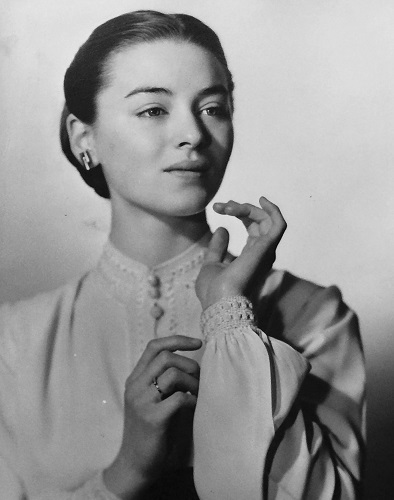
- Virginia Bosler headshot circa 1947
- Born: September 23, 1926; Newton, Massachusetts, U.S.
- Died: August 30, 2020 (aged 93); Ellsworth, Maine, U.S.
- Other name: “Winkie”
- Occupations: Actress, dancer
- Known for: Brigadoon, Oklahoma! and Broadway musicals
- Spouse: Hubert Alexander Doris (1956–2008; his death)
- Children: 2

Virginia Bosler (September 23, 1926 – August 30, 2020), known to friends by her childhood nickname "Winkie", was an American actress born in Newton, Massachusetts. She was known for acting in Broadway musicals.

== Early ==
Bosler's father was a maritime engineer, and her early years were spent relocating frequently along the eastern coast. At seven years old, she moved to Great Neck, Long Island, and was enrolled into ballet classes by her mother, who was concerned about her daughter's posture. For three years, Bosler studied with Mikhail Mordkin and the Swobodas before moving to New London, Connecticut, where her dance studies halted until high school.

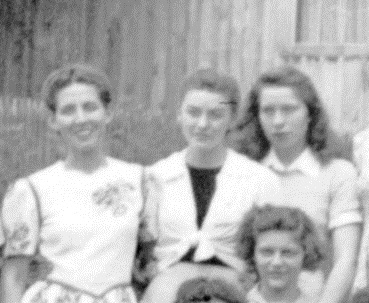
Virginia Bosler (middle) at Jacob's Pillow (summer 1943)

== Dance training ==
Bosler resumed her dance training while attending the progressive Cherry Lawn High School in Darien, Connecticut, focusing on modern and folk dancing under Hanya Holm protégée, Laura Morgan. She first attended the renowned Jacob's Pillow in Becket, Massachusetts, at the age of 15 between her sophomore and junior years of high school. Bosler returned for the following two summers as a scholarship student; dancing in the Jacob's Pillow Dance Festival, learning Pilates directly from its creator, Joseph Pilates, and earning the respect of Jacob's Pillow founder, Ted Shawn.

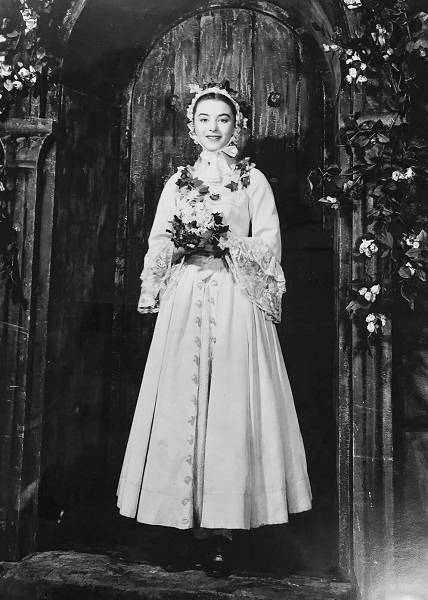
Virginia Bosler in the original Broadway production of Brigadoon (1947)

After what Bosler considered a “disastrous” year at Barnard College, she left school to pursue a dance career. She studied with Hanya Holm as well as Cia Fornaroli and Merce Cunningham. Bosler's big break came in the spring of 1946 when she was cast in the tour of Bloomer Girl, choreographed by Agnes de Mille and starring Nanette Fabray. After observing Bosler's performance in the tour over the next nine months (which took her to cities such as Toronto, Boston, Los Angeles, and Washington, DC), de Mille requested that she fly to New York while on the Pittsburgh tour stop to audition for the upcoming Alan Jay Lerner/Frederick Loewe show, Brigadoon.

== Roles ==
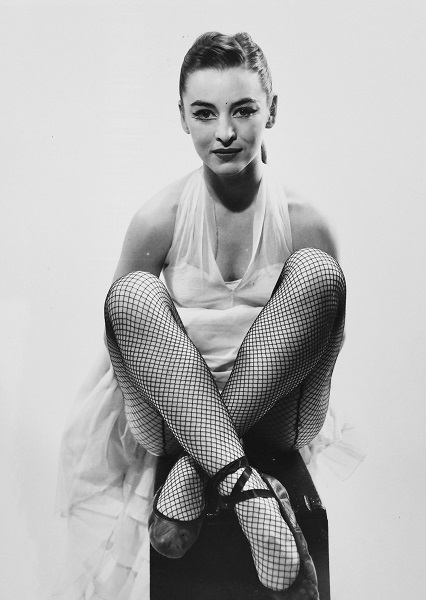
Virginia Bosler in Leonard Sillman's New Faces of 1952

Bosler originated the role of Jean MacLaren in Brigadoon (1947), a role she would play for over a year and a half on Broadway, for another year on tour, and repeat in the 1954 film adaptation (though her role was drastically reduced from the stage version). Bosler would go on to perform on Broadway from 1950 to '51 in the Agnes de Mille-directed Cole Porter musical Out of This World (choreographed by her former teacher Hanya Holm, and starring Charlotte Greenwood), later appearing in Gentlemen Prefer Blondes (as a replacement and member of the closing cast in 1951); the flop musical A Month of Sundays (starring Nancy Walker), which closed out of town in January 1952; and Leonard Sillman’s New Faces of 1952 (1952–1953).

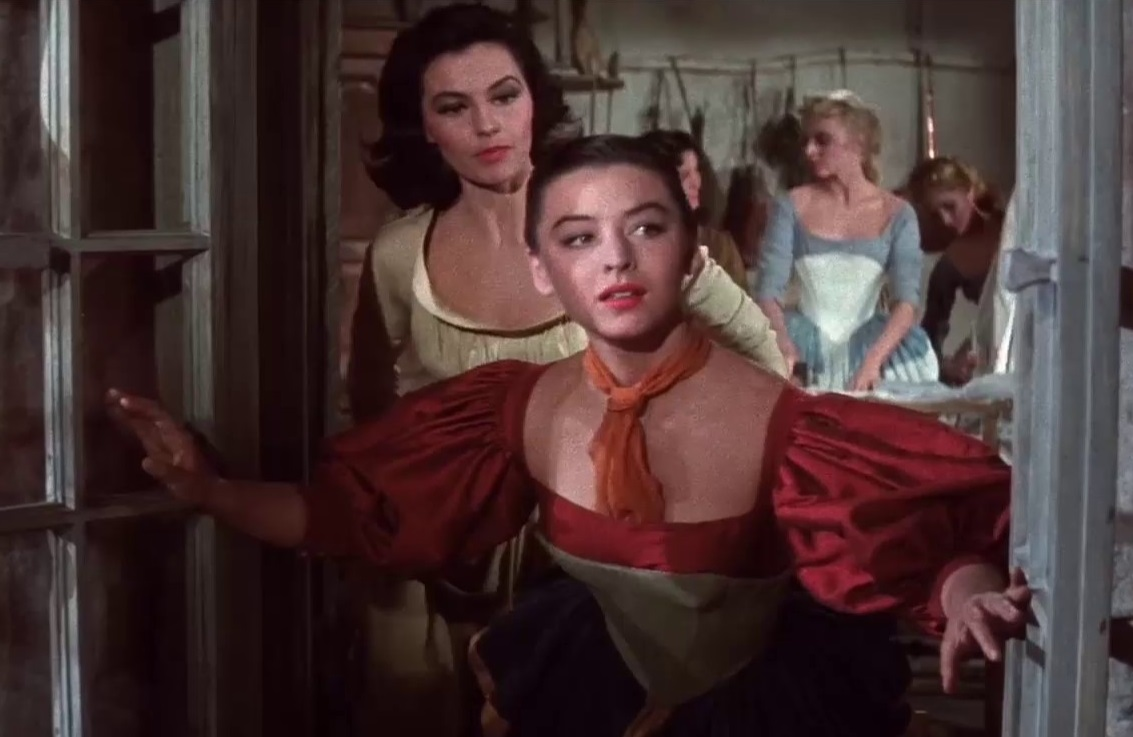
Virginia Bosler in Brigadoon (1954)

Though officially a member of the Agnes de Mille Dance Theatre for a national tour from 1953 to 1954, Bosler was absent for a large portion of the engagements as she was filming Brigadoon from December 1953 to March 1954 in Culver City. Just as the film of Brigadoon premiered in September 1954, Bosler returned to Culver City to shoot her scenes for the film version of the Richard Rodgers/Oscar Hammerstein II stage hit, Oklahoma!, for which Agnes de Mille recreated and adapted her original stage choreography. Both Brigadoon and Oklahoma! are notable for being two of the few motion pictures shot twice during principal photography using separate cameras and “takes” to accommodate the new experimental widescreen processes of CinemaScope and Todd-AO, respectively. As such, different versions of both films exist using the same prerecorded songs, though it is unclear whether the “flat” version of Brigadoon was ever released (it isn't available on home video).

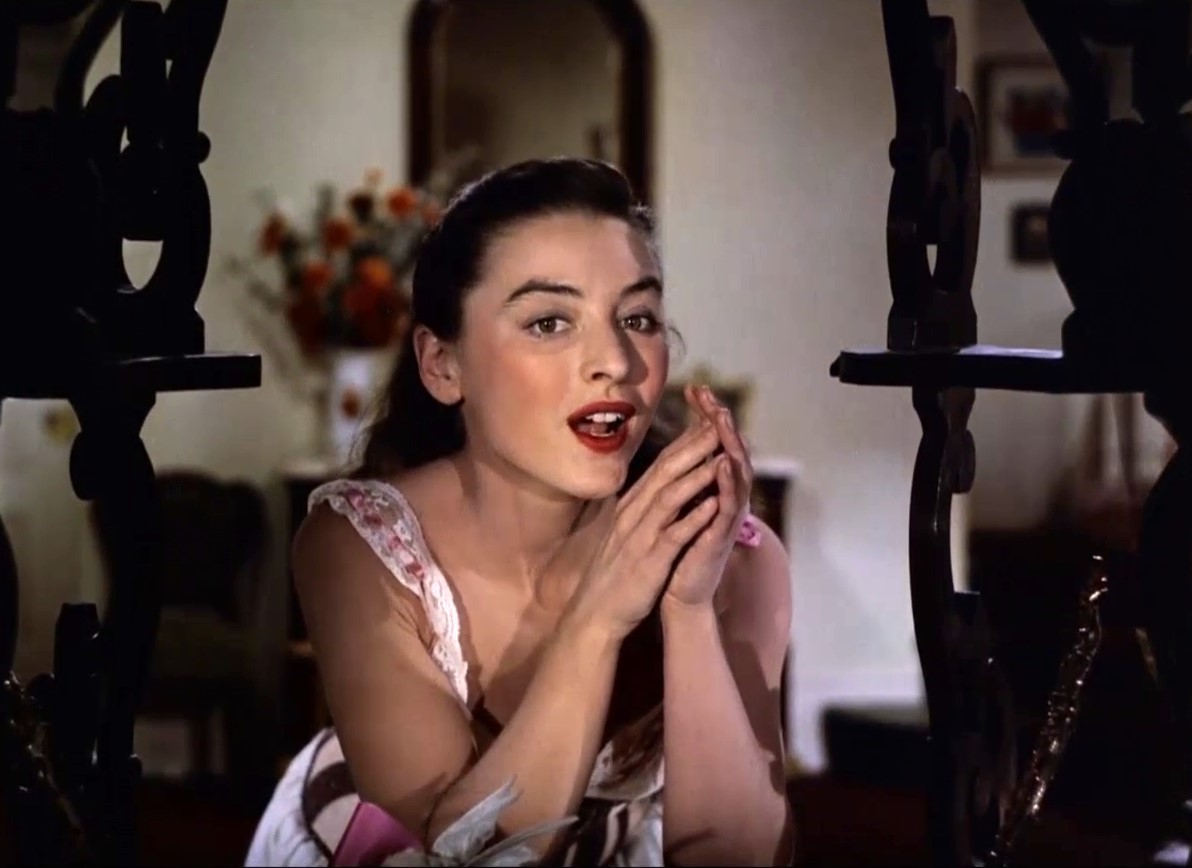
Virginia Bosler in Oklahoma! (1955)

A European stage tour of Oklahoma! (headlined by Shirley Jones and Jack Cassidy) followed in the summer of 1955 with stops in Paris, Rome, and London, and the film opened in its first-run Todd-AO 70mm engagements in October. Virginia returned to the role of Jean MacLaren for several revivals of Brigadoon, most notably at New York City Center in 1957 and 1963. She also appeared in the live “Producers’ Showcase” NBC broadcasts of Bloomer Girl and Jack and the Beanstalk in 1956.

Bosler appeared in a few short-lived non-musical roles on and off Broadway before effectively retiring from public performance in 1963.

== Later ==
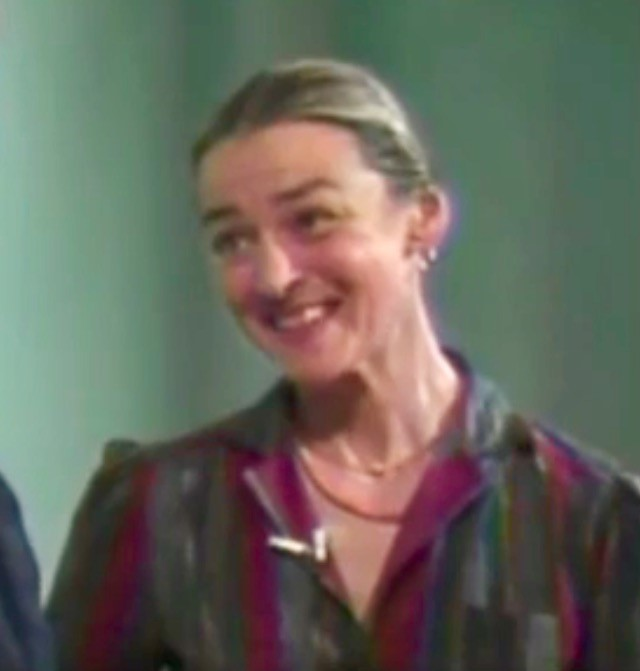
Virginia Bosler in 1984

By the end of the 1970s, Bosler began to study Labanotation, a method to document and preserve choreography in print. Over the next 10 years working for the Dance Notation Bureau in New York City, she created Labanotation scores for works by choreographers such as George Balanchine, Agnes de Mille, Eugene Loring, and Richard Englund, all of which are stored within the archives at the New York Public Library for future study and performance.

Bosler began a new career teaching yoga in 1997 at the age of seventy.

== Personal ==
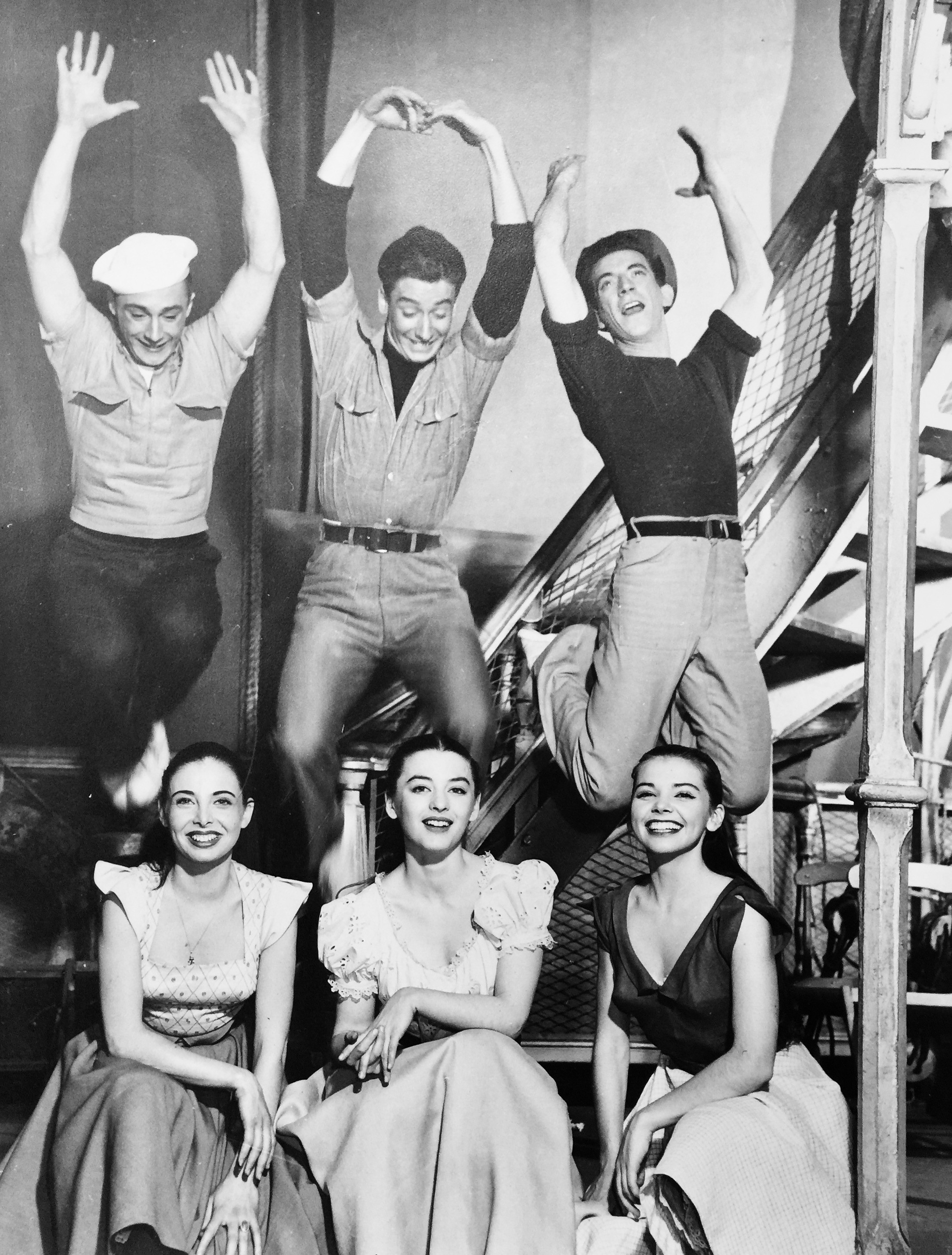
Virginia Bosler in A Month of Sundays (1951)

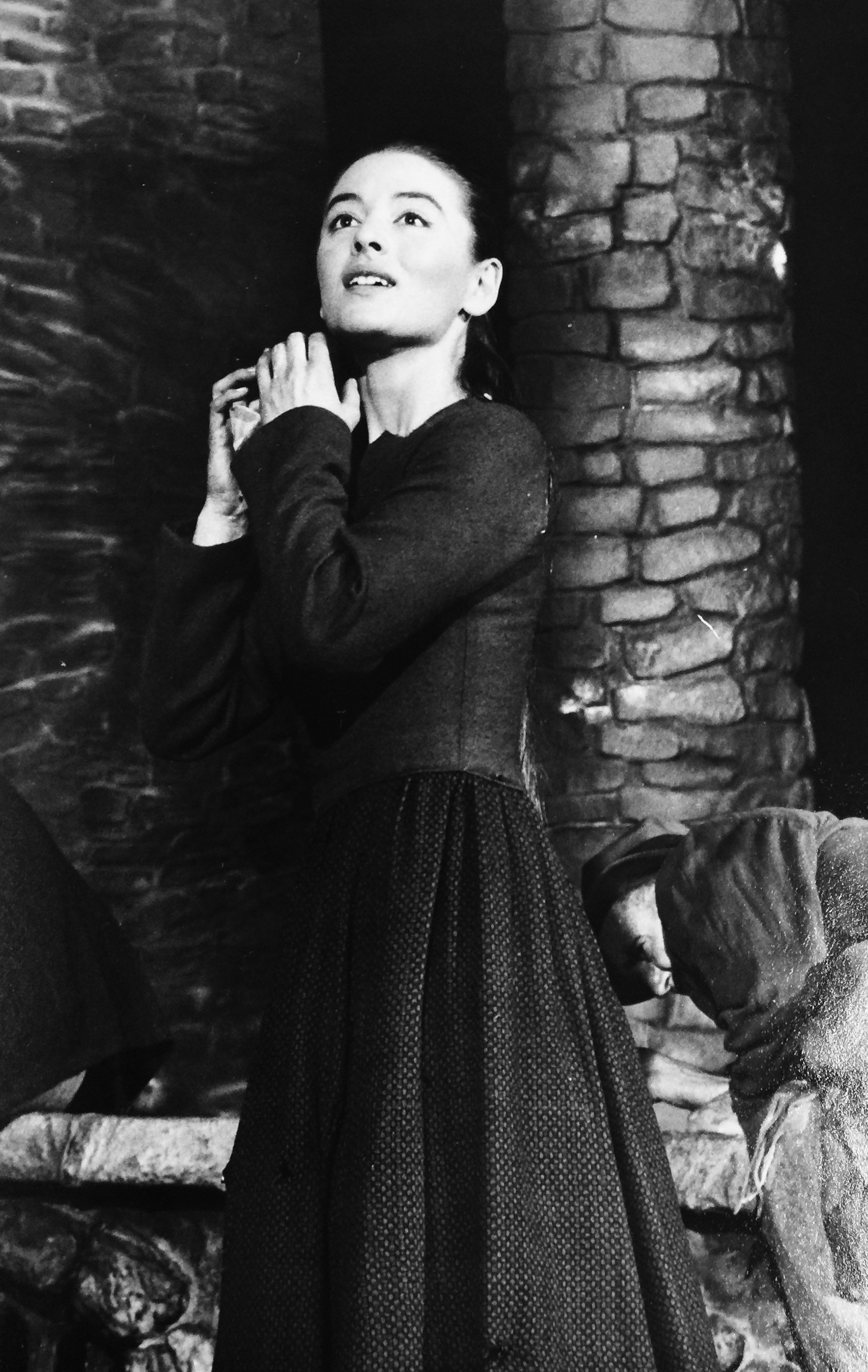
Virginia Bosler in Red Roses for Me (1955)

Just before turning thirty, Bosler married Hubert Alexander Doris, a professor of music at Barnard College, in 1956. A quiet family life followed with Bosler as the wife of an esteemed professor and mother of two adopted children, Alexander and Julia. Her husband died on June 8, 2008, at their home in Hancock, Maine. “Winkie” lived out a quiet retirement in Ellsworth, Maine. She died August 30, 2020.

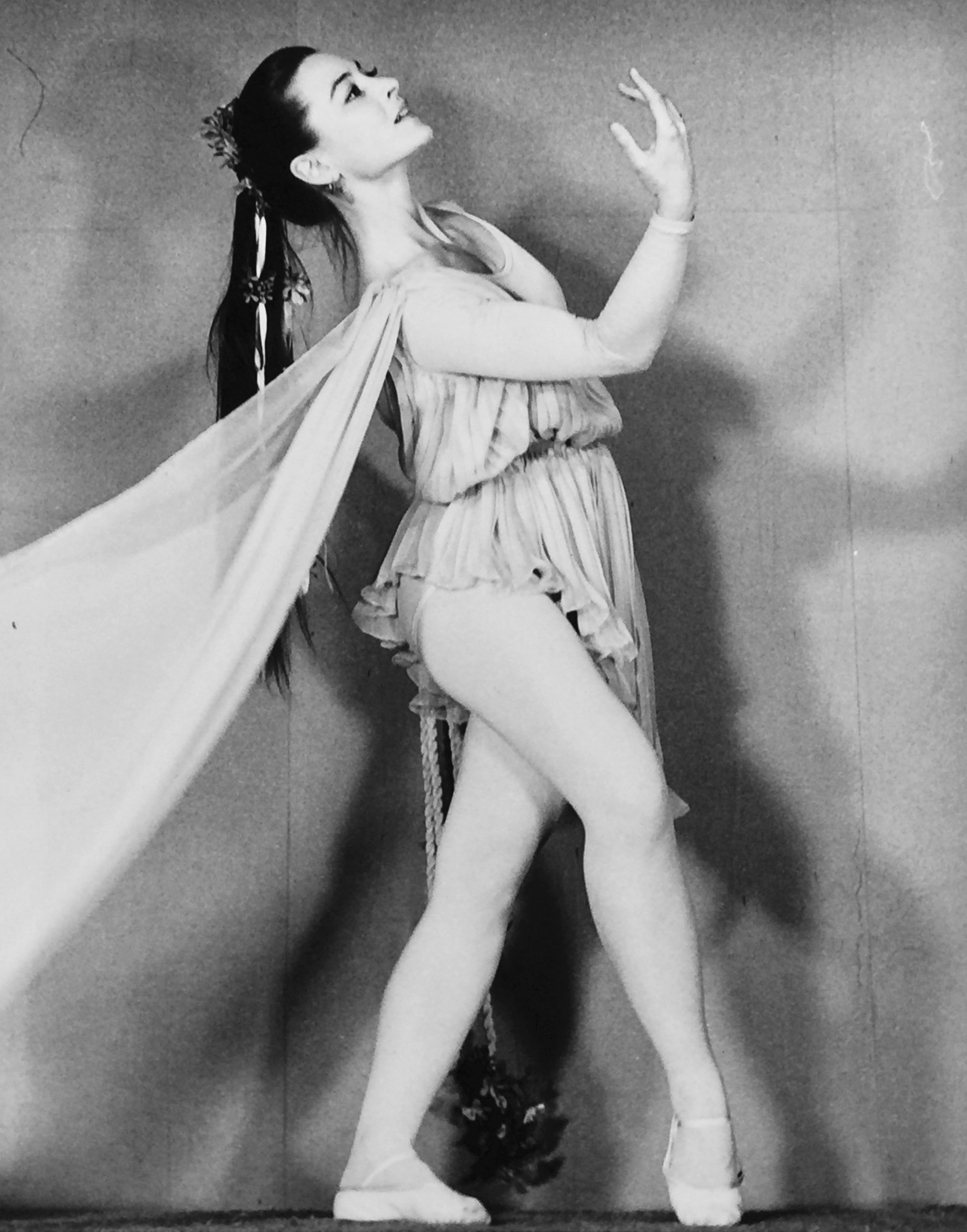
Virginia Bosler in If Five Years Pass (1962)

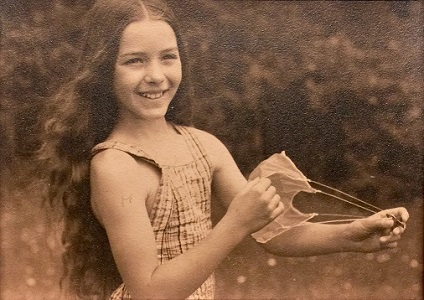
Virginia Bosler at 8 years old (spring/summer 1935)

== Performances ==
=== Theatre ===
- Bloomer Girl (National Tour – 1946)
- Brigadoon (Broadway – 1947–1948)
- Brigadoon (National Tour – 1948–1949)
- Out of This World (Broadway – 1950–1951)
- Gentlemen Prefer Blondes (Broadway replacement – closing cast – 1951)
- A Month of Sundays (closed out-of-town – 1952)
- Leonard Sillman's New Faces of 1952 (Broadway – 1952–1953)
- Agnes de Mille Dance Theatre tour (1953–1954)
- Oklahoma! (European Tour – 1955)
- Red Roses for Me (Broadway – 1955)
- Finian's Rainbow (Valley Forge Music Fair, PA – 1956)
- Brigadoon (New York City Center – 1957)
- If Five Years Pass (Off-Broadway – 1962)
- Brigadoon (New York City Center – 1963)
- Oklahoma! (New York City Center – 1963)

=== Film ===
- Brigadoon (1954) - Jean Campbell
- Oklahoma! (1955) - Dancer

=== TV ===
- Producers' Showcase Bloomer Girl (1956)
- Producers' Showcase Jack and the Beanstalk (1956)
- Bell Telephone Hour Cherry Tree Carol (1959)
- Dance On (1984)
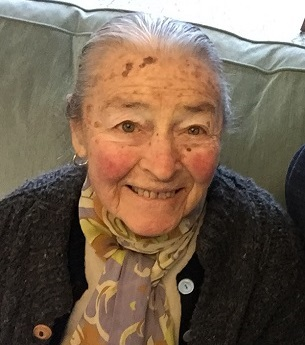
  Virginia Doris at 91 1/2 (April 2018)
