= Singin' in the Rain (musical) =

1983 stage musical adapted from the 1952 film of the same name

- Original Cast Recording
- Music: Nacio Herb Brown
- Lyrics: Arthur Freed
- Book: Adolph Green; Betty Comden
- Basis: Singin' in the Rain by Adolph Green; Betty Comden
- Productions: 1983 West End; 1985 Broadway; 1989 West End; 2000 National Theatre; 2012 West End

Singin' in the Rain is a stage musical with story by Betty Comden and Adolph Green, lyrics by Arthur Freed, and music by Nacio Herb Brown. Adapted from the 1952 movie of the same name, the plot closely adheres to the original. Set in Hollywood in the waning days of the silent screen era, it focuses on romantic lead Don Lockwood, his sidekick Cosmo Brown, aspiring actress Kathy Selden, and Lockwood's leading lady Lina Lamont, whose less-than-dulcet vocal tones make her an unlikely candidate for stardom in talking pictures.

The show had its world premiere in 1983 at the London Palladium, where it ran for more than two years, and has spawned a Broadway production and many stagings worldwide.

== Productions ==
=== Original West End production ===
The original West End production, directed by Tommy Steele and choreographed by Peter Gennaro, opened on June 30, 1983 at the London Palladium, where it ran until September 1985. The original cast included Steele as Don, Roy Castle as Cosmo, Danielle Carson as Kathy, and Sarah Payne as Lina and Julia. The original film's vocal score was embellished with additional tunes by Comden, Green, and Roger Edens, Dorothy Fields and Jimmy McHugh, George and Ira Gershwin, Johnny Mercer and Richard Whiting, and Cole Porter.

=== Original Broadway production ===
Singin' in the Rain opened on Broadway at the Gershwin Theatre on July 2, 1985 and closed on May 18, 1986 after 367 performances and 38 previews. Directed and choreographed by Twyla Tharp, the scenic design was by Santo Loquasto, costume design by Ann Roth, and lighting design by Jennifer Tipton. The cast included Don Correia as Don (earning a nomination for the Tony Award for Best Actor in a Musical), Mary D'Arcy as Kathy, Peter Slutsker as Cosmo, and Faye Grant as Lina.

=== 1989 West End return engagement ===
After touring the UK, Singin' in the Rain returned to the London Palladium from June 29 to November 18, 1989, again with Steele as Don, Bunny May as Cosmo, Danielle Carson as Kathy, and Sarah Payne as Lina. Originally planned for a thirteen-week run, the performances were extended due to popular demand.

=== 1994 UK tour ===
The 1983 London Palladium production was remounted in 1994 for an extensive tour of the United Kingdom, which ran until December 1995. The new production, again directed by Steele, starred Paul Nicholas as Don, Shona Lindsay as Kathy, Tony Howes as Cosmo with Sarah Payne reprising her role as Lina from the original cast. Supporting cast included Matt Zimmerman and Mark Donovan.

=== 2000 National Theatre ===
A new production of the musical was staged at the Olivier Theatre (Royal National Theatre), from June 22 to July 20, 2000 and again from December 18, 2000, to January 27, 2001. This production was a transfer from the West Yorkshire production, which ran from December 1999 to February 2000. The cast featured Zoe Hart as Kathy, Rebecca Thornhill as Lina, and Paul Robinson as Don. The direction was by Jude Kelly, and choreography was by Stephen Mear. Thornhill received an Olivier Award nomination for her performance.

=== 2004 Sadler's Wells Theatre ===
The musical was played at the Sadler's Wells Theatre from July 29, 2004, to September 4, 2004, with direction by Paul Kerryson and choreography by Adam Cooper, who also played the lead role of Don Lockwood. The cast also included Simon Coulthard as Cosmo, Josefina Gabrielle as Kathy, and Ronni Ancona as Lina. Cooper's choreography was nominated for the 2004 Critic's Circle National Dance award. The show later transferred to Leicester Haymarket.

=== 2011 Chichester Festival Theatre and 2012 West End ===
The show was revived at the 2011 Chichester Festival Theatre, starring Adam Cooper as Don, Daniel Crossley as Cosmo, Scarlett Strallen as Kathy, and Katherine Kingsley as Lina. It was choreographed by Andrew Wright who was nominated for an Olivier Award and won the WhatsOnStage award for his work. The show received positive reviews, and then transferred to London's West End, at the Palace Theatre, in February 2012, where Cooper, Crossley, Strallen, and Kingsley all reprised their roles. From 18 February 2013, the role of Kathy Selden was played by Louise Bowden. The production closed on 8 June 2013. A cast recording of Singin' in the Rain was issued in 2012.

=== 2013 UK tour ===
A UK tour followed the show closing on the West End, starting on November 9 at the Manchester Opera House.

=== 2015 Paris and proposed Broadway transfer ===
The Théâtre du Châtelet in Paris presented a new production from March 12 to 26, 2015, and again from November 27 to January 17, 2016, directed by Robert Carsen, choreography by Stephen Mear, and costumes by Anthony Powell. This production faithfully reproduced the dialogue and action of the film, with its songs by Nacio Herb Brown and Arthur Freed, and its famous splash-in-the-puddles, rain-drenched dance solo for Don Lockwood.

The New York Times reported in November 2015 that the Théâtre du Châtelet production would transfer to Broadway in the fall of 2016, produced by Weinstein Live Entertainment. However, the musical's opening on Broadway was reportedly delayed in 2016 "due to a lack of available theaters"; at that time, the musical was still expected to open on Broadway. In October 2017, Playbill reported that the Théâtre du Châtelet had informed the magazine that a Broadway transfer produced by Weinstein Live Entertainment would not take place.

=== 2021 Sadler's Wells Theatre and 2022 UK tour ===
The 2012 London production was revived at the Sadler's Wells Theatre from July 30 to September 5, 2021, with Adam Cooper reprising his role of Don Lockwood, Charlotte Gooch as Kathy Selden, Kevin Clifton as Cosmo Brown, and Faye Tozer as Lina Lamont. Following the Sadler's Wells run, another UK tour began on March 17, 2022 at the Marlowe Theatre, Canterbury and closed on August 20, 2022 at the Theatre Royal, Plymouth. This production was delayed from 2020 due to the COVID-19 pandemic.

=== 2025 Royal Exchange Theatre ===
A new production of the musical was staged Royal Exchange Theatre in Manchester from 29 November 2025 to 25 January 2026. The cast featured Carly Mercedes Dyer as Kathy Selden, Laura Baldwin as Lina Lamont, Danny Collins as Cosmo Brown and Louis Gaunt as Don Lockwood. The production was directed by Raz Shaw.

=== 2027 UK and Ireland tour ===
The Chichester Festival Theatre production is set to tour the UK and Ireland in 2027.

== Synopsis ==
=== Act I ===
Outside of Grauman's Chinese Theater in 1927 ("Overture"), celebrity news reporter, Dora Bailey, interviews Monumental Pictures' president R.F. Simpson, director Roscoe Dexter, actress Lina Lamont, her co-star and supposed fiancée Don Lockwood, and Don's best friend and composer, Cosmo Brown. After being pressed by Dora and the audience in attendance, Don recaps his early days as an aspiring actor and vaudevillian, how he met Cosmo, and got his start in show business, which ultimately led to a talent scout seeing both Don and Cosmo's talents and recruiting them both for bigger projects. ("Fit as a Fiddle")

Inside the theater, fans applaud a screening of the latest Lockwood-Lamont picture, The Royal Rascal, as Don hastily pulls Lina off-stage during their post-film speech. Lina, who is revealed to have a harsh, nasally voice, proclaims Don to really be her "fee-yan-see" in spite of Don's clear resentment of her as well as the entire engagement being nothing more than a publicity stunt. Processing his feelings on the matter, Don decides to walk to the after-party being held at R.F.'s mansion, where he is accosted by crazed fans. Don manages to dissuade them by pretending to be a normal passer-by, claiming to be the boyfriend of a nearby woman. When the woman tries to call the police on Don, she eventually recognizes him and introduces herself as Kathy Selden, a stage actress. Unimpressed with Don's "pantomime on the screen", the two of them trade insults back and forth, with Don becoming completely smitten over Kathy ("You Stepped Out of a Dream"). When a crowd begins to form around Don, he quickly escapes the commotion as a mob of women tear off his jacket sleeve. During a transition, the men, now left behind by their dates, dance with a new group of women as the scene moves to R.F.'s mansion, where an already intoxicated Lina sings along. ("Temptation Tango")

At R.F.'s party, a demonstration of a "talking picture" is shown to the party-goers, with everyone visibly disturbed and conflicted at the revelation of the gadget. Afterwards, Lina tries to flirt with Don, only to be interrupted by Kathy jumping out of a massive cake, revealed to be nothing more than a showgirl who performs a dance routine for the guests ("All I Do"). Enraged that Don has found out her true occupation and annoyed by his constant belittlement, Kathy throws a pie at Don, only to end up hitting Lina. Kathy runs off in embarrassment, leaving Don regretful ("You Stepped out of a Dream (Reprise)").

Three weeks later, Don is on the set of his newest film, The Dueling Cavalier, still heartbroken over losing Kathy. Cosmo tries to cheer Don up by reminding him of his acting chops ("Make 'Em Laugh"), before Dexter and his assistant directors begin filming. Lina reveals to Don that she had Kathy fired from her job at the Coconut Grove, causing Don to explode at her. R.F. interrupts the shoot to halt production, as Warner Brothers' latest film, The Jazz Singer (a talking picture), was a smash hit in spite of everyone's predictions of failure. Realizing "talkies" are the way of the future, R.F. orders Cavalier to be converted into a talking picture, much to the annoyance of Dexter and his crew.

While filming a musical on another lot ("Beautiful Girl"), director Sid Phillips has Kathy, who was one of the dancers in the number, perform for R.F. for a chance at an upcoming role ("You Are My Lucky Star"). Cosmo, who performs the music for Kathy's audition, tells Don of his discovery, allowing Don to reunite with Kathy. Learning of Kathy's connection to Lina, R.F. hires Kathy in secret, as Don takes Kathy out to lunch and professes his love for her ("You Were Meant for Me").

Don and Lina take diction courses in order to perfect their speech for their upcoming movie ("Moses Supposes"), as Dexter and his crew struggle to record Lina's lines efficiently ("Moses Supposes (Reprise)"). At the preview for Dueling Cavalier, the entire showing goes awry due to Lina's flat delivery, Don's uninspired improv, and the sound going out of synch from the picture. Scheduled to open in less than six weeks, the film looks to be the end of Don's screen career. After jokingly suggesting a return to vaudeville, Kathy recommends turning Cavalier into a musical to save its reputation. Don and Cosmo enthusiastically agree, and celebrate the brilliant idea ("Good Mornin'"). However, when Don realizes Lina won't be able to act or sing, Cosmo comes up with the idea to dub Lina's lines over with Kathy's vocals. Don is hesitant, believing Kathy would waste her career away, but agrees only after Kathy persuades him to do it. That night, after dropping Kathy off at home, Don dances in the streets on a cold, rainy night. ("Singin' in the Rain")

=== Act II ===
As reshoots begin on the newly-renamed The Dancing Cavalier, Kathy begins to record over Lina's lines in secret. ("Would You?") Don and Cosmo are thrilled over the progress being made on the film, but the excitement is ruined by a scorned Lina, who, thanks to her best friend and fellow actress, Zelda Zanders, finds Don and Kathy together. After Don reveals his intent to one day marry Kathy as well as Monumental's plans to not only re-record Lina's songs and dialogue but to also give Kathy a full screen credit, Lina runs off to her dressing room, distraught. Cosmo and Don calm Kathy's nerves as Lina laments to Zelda about Don's lack of romantic interest in her. ("What's Wrong With Me?")

R.F. remains steadfast in his commitment to promoting Kathy's big debut, in spite of Lina's threats. As Dexter ponders how to film Cavalier's final dance number, R.F. suggests "tap dancing! We've got to have tap dancing!". With that, Cosmo helps R.F. and Dexter visualize a big production number featuring an elaborate tap sequence under the pretense of a modern framing device ("Broadway Ballet"/"Broadway Melody"). R.F., still unconvinced, asks Cosmo to do the whole number over again. Cosmo exaggeratedly passes out in exhaustion.

At the premiere of The Dancing Cavalier, Dexter and R.F. learn from Rod, the head of Monumental's publicity department, that newspapers all over town are publishing articles claiming Lina to be singing her own songs. As Rod bemoans the lack of communication and the money wasted on Kathy's campaign that will no longer come to fruition, Lina approaches the trio, revealing that she had read a clause in her contract that allows her to control her own publicity, not the studio. A defeated R.F. has no choice but to agree to Lina's demands at the risk of a lawsuit, in addition to forcing Kathy into becoming Lina's permanent vocal replacement without credit.

After the showing, Don, Cosmo, and Kathy celebrate their hard work as Lina reveals her scheme to ride off Kathy's success. As R.F. struggles to stand up to Lina and Rod continues complying to Lina's demands, Don plots to reveal Lina's deception to the audience in attendance by having her deliver the post-screening speech instead of him. When the audience becomes confused at Lina's real voice over the one she used in the movie, they demand she sing. R.F., Don, and Cosmo force Kathy to sing backstage into a microphone for Lina to lip-synch to, reminding Kathy of her iron-clad contract with Monumental. Feeling betrayed, Kathy breaks up with Don as she begins to sing for Lina. ("Would You? (Reprise)") However, Don raises the curtain on Lina to reveal Kathy singing in her stead, as Cosmo takes over to sing for Lina, humiliating her into running off-stage. Kathy tries to flee through the crowd, but is stopped by Don, who tells the audience that she, is in fact, the real star of the picture ("You Are My Lucky Star (Reprise)"). The two embrace as the show ends. ("Singin' in the Rain (Finale)")

== On-stage rain ==
The highlight of both productions was the recreation of the film's title tune sequence, complete with an on-stage rain shower. According to The New York Times review, "The rain is wonderful. It descends from the flies of the Gershwin Theater in sheets at the end of Act I, drenching a Santo Loquasto courtyard set that floats beneath a distant, twinkling Hollywoodland sign..."

Of the London "rain" effect, a reviewer wrote: "The stage downpour is so noisy -- and poses such a danger of microphone short circuits -- that Steele has to mime his song to a tape recording."

== Musical numbers ==
=== Original Broadway production ===
Act I

- "Fit as a Fiddle" – Don Lockwood and Cosmo Brown
- "Beautiful Girl" – Don Lockwood and Fans
- "I've Got a Feelin' You're Foolin'" – Kathy Selden and Coconut Grove Coquettes
- "Make 'Em Laugh" – Cosmo Brown
- "Hub Bub" – Cosmo Brown and Studio Stage Hands
- "You Are My Lucky Star" – Don Lockwood and Kathy Selden
- "Moses Supposes" – Don Lockwood and Cosmo Brown
- "Good Mornin'" – Don Lockwood, Kathy Selden and Cosmo Brown
- "Singin' in the Rain" – Don Lockwood

Act II

- "Wedding of the Painted Doll" – Selected Ensemble
- "Rag Doll" – Selected Ensemble
- "Temptation" – Selected Ensemble
- "Takin' Miss Mary to the Ball" – Selected Ensemble
- "Love is Where You Find It" – Ensemble
- "Would You?" – Kathy Selden
- "Broadway Rhythm" – Company
- "Blue Prelude" – Company
- "Would You?" (Reprise) – Kathy Selden
- "You Are My Lucky Star" (Reprise) – Don Lockwood, Kathy Selden and Company
- "Singin' in the Rain" (Reprise) – Company

=== 2012 West End revival ===
Act I

- "Overture" – Orchestra
- "Fit As a Fiddle" – Don Lockwood, Cosmo Brown
- "The Royal Rascal" – Orchestra
- "You Stepped Out of a Dream" – Don Lockwood and Company
- "All I Do" – Kathy Selden and Girls of the Coconut Grove
- "You Stepped Out of a Dream" (Reprise) – Don Lockwood
- "Make 'Em Laugh" – Cosmo Brown
- "Beautiful Girl" – Production Tenor and Female Chorus (including Kathy Selden)
- "You Are My Lucky Star" – Kathy Selden
- "You Were Meant for Me" – Don Lockwood and Kathy Selden
- "Moses Supposes" – Don Lockwood and Cosmo Brown
- "Moses Supposes" (Reprise) – Company
- "Good Morning" – Don Lockwood, Cosmo Brown and Kathy Selden
- "Singin' in the Rain" – Don Lockwood

Act II

- "Entr'acte" – Orchestra
- "Good Morning" (Reprise) – Company
- "Would You?" – Kathy Selden
- "What's Wrong With Me?" – Lina Lamont
- "Broadway Ballet" – Cosmo Brown, Don Lockwood and Full Company
- "Would You?" (Reprise) – Kathy Selden (voicing for Lina) and Cosmo Brown
- "You Are My Lucky Star" (Reprise) – Kathy Selden and Don Lockwood
- "Singin' in the Rain" (Finale) – Full Company

== Original casts ==
Character	West End (1983)	Broadway (1985)	West End (1989)	National Theatre (2000)	Sadler's Wells Theatre (2004)	West End (2012)	Sadler's Wells Theatre (2021)	Royal Exchange Theatre (2025)
Don Lockwood	Tommy Steele	Don Correia	Tommy Steele	Paul Robinson	Adam Cooper	Adam Cooper	Adam Cooper	Louis Gaunt
Kathy Selden	Danielle Carson	Mary D'Arcy	Danielle Carson	Zoe Hart	Josefina Gabrielle	Scarlett Strallen	Charlotte Gooch	Carly Mercedes Dyer
Cosmo Brown	Roy Castle	Peter Slutsker	Bunny May	Mark Channon	Simon Coulthard	Daniel Crossley	Kevin Clifton	Danny Collins
Lina Lamont	Sarah Payne	Faye Grant	Sarah Payne	Rebecca Thornhill	Ronni Ancona	Katherine Kingsley	Faye Tozer	Laura Baldwin
R. F. Simpson	Kalman Glass	Hansford Rowe	Kalman Glass	Adrian McLoughlin	Peter Forbes	Michael Brandon	Cavin Cornwall	Julius D’Silva
Roscoe Dexter	Matt Zimmerman	Richard Fancy	Graham Hoadly	Tony Timberlake	Claude Close	Peter Forbes	Michael Matus	Carl Sanderson

== Awards and nominations ==
=== Original West End production ===
Year	Award	Category	Nominee	Result
1983	Laurence Olivier Award	Best Actress in a Musical	Sarah Payne	Nominated

=== Original Broadway production ===
Year	Award	Category	Nominee	Result
1986	Tony Award	Best Book of a Musical	Betty Comden and Adolph Green	Nominated
1986	Tony Award	Best Performance by a Leading Actor in a Musical	Don Correia	Nominated

=== 2000 London revival ===
Year	Award	Category	Nominee	Result
2001	Laurence Olivier Award	Best Musical Revival		Won
2001	Laurence Olivier Award	Best Actor in a Musical	Paul Robinson	Nominated
2001	Laurence Olivier Award	Best Performance in a Supporting Role in a Musical	Rebecca Thornhill	Nominated
2001	Laurence Olivier Award	Best Theatre Choreographer	Stephen Mear	Nominated

=== 2012 West End revival ===
Year	Award	Category	Nominee	Result
2012	Laurence Olivier Award	Best Actress in a Musical	Scarlett Strallen	Nominated
2012	Laurence Olivier Award	Best Performance in a Supporting Role in a Musical	Katherine Kingsley	Nominated
2012	Laurence Olivier Award	Best Theatre Choreographer	Andrew Wright	Nominated
