= Louis Gaunt =

British actor and singer

Louis Gaunt is a British actor, singer, and musical theatre performer. He starred as Bert in the acclaimed West End production of Mary Poppins. In 2018, he earned The Stage Debut Award for Best Actor in a Musical for his role as Will Parker in Oklahoma!. More recently, Gaunt gained widespread recognition for his portrayal of Lord Lumley in the second season of Bridgerton.

== Early life ==
As a child, Gaunt initially aspired to a career in football. However, during his teenage years, his passion for dance and singing took precedence. He went on to train professionally at Performers College in Essex, graduating in the summer of 2018.

== Career ==
Gaunt made his professional stage debut in Oklahoma! shortly after graduating, portraying Will Parker — a role that earned him The Stage Debut Award for Best Actor in a Musical in 2018. He has since performed in various productions, including playing Bert in the acclaimed West End revival of Mary Poppins.

In 2025, he starred as Tommy Albright in Brigadoon at Regents Park Open Air Theatre . And starred in Singin' in the Rain at the Royal Exchange Theatre as Don Lockwood returning after performing as Tulsa in Gypsy in 2019.

During his training, Gaunt appeared in several stage productions such as Dick Whittington at the London Palladium, Ishq the Musical at Sadler’s Wells, Robinson Crusoe at Cliffs Pavilion, and Move It at ExCeL London.

In 2024, he rose to wider public attention with his role as Lord Lumley in the second season of Netflix’s hit period drama Bridgerton.

In 2026 he played Tristian in the film Sunny Dancer.

== Filmography ==
=== Film ===
Year	Title	Role	Notes
2026	Sunny Dancer	Tristan	

=== Television ===
Year	Title	Role	Notes
2021	The Larkins	Eddie	1 episode
2022	Bridgerton	Lord Lumley	2 episodes

== Stage ==
Year	Title	Role	Notes
2018	Oklahoma!	Will Parker	Grange Park Opera
2018	Sweet Charity	Manfred	Nottingham Playhouse
2019	Standing At The Sky's Edge	Kevin/Max	Sheffield Crucible
2019	The Happy Prince	Charlie	The Place
2019	Grease	Kenickie	UK Tour
2019-2020	Gypsy	Tulsa	Royal Exchange Theatre, Manchester
2021	Piaf	Theo/Marcel/Jacques	Nottingham Playhouse
2022	Mary Poppins	Bert	Prince Edward Theatre
2022-2023	Jack And The Beanstalk	Jack	London Palladium
2023	The Wizard of Oz	The Scarecrow	London Palladium
2023-2024	Peter Pan	Peter Pan	London Palladium
2025	Brigadoon	Tommy	Regent's Park Open Air Theatre
2025-2026	Singin' In The Rain	Don Lockwood	Royal Exchange Theatre, Manchester
