= Lidija Franklin =

American dancer and teacher (1917–2019)

Lidija Franklin (née Kocers; May 17, 1917 – December 5, 2019) was an American dancer and teacher of Latvian descent, originally from the Moscow area. In the United States, she was known primarily for her association with Agnes de Mille.

== Performances ==
Franklin (née Kocers) performed with the Jooss Ballet until the early 1940s, then relocated to the US and began working in musical theater. She was the female principal dancer in Bloomer Girl (1944) and Maggie Anderson in the original Brigadoon (1947). (Franklin also played Maggie in the 1957 revival.)

As a concert dancer, Franklin toured as a principal with the Agnes de Mille Dance Theatre and made occasional guest appearances with the American Ballet Theatre. She also worked with the modern dance choreographer Pauline Koner.

== Later life ==
She turned 100 in May 2017 and died in December 2019 at the age of 102.
