= NHT Loudspeakers =

- Company type: Private
- Founded: 1986
- Headquarters: Benicia, California, United States
- Key people: Chris Byrne Partner/Founder Jonathan Sun CEO Antonio Lopez International Director
- Products: Loudspeakers, Audio electronics, Subwoofers
- Website: www.nhthifi.com

NHT Loudspeakers (Now Hear This), often colloquially referred to as NHT Audio, is an American loudspeaker and audio component company based in Benicia, California. The company was founded by Chris Byrne and Ken Kantor in December 1986.

NHT home theater products have historically included loudspeakers, A/V processors, and amplifiers. NHT professional processors and speakers are used in recording and production studios. The current NHT lineup consists solely of acoustic suspension loudspeakers and in-wall/in-ceiling speakers.

== History ==
Byrne primarily handled sales and marketing, while Kantor (introduced to Byrne by Michael Riggs, then at High Fidelity magazine) was responsible for design and engineering.

In 1987, NHT shipped its first product, the Model 1 loudspeaker.

In 2004, NHT unveiled its XdS line of speakers and supporting processors. XdS speakers are DSP corrected active speakers with digital amplifiers. The XdS line has since been discontinued.

In 2007, NHT introduced the Classic Three Bookshelf Speaker, which received critical acclaim. Theo Nicolakis of Audioholics wrote that "what the Classic Threes do have is a total sonic package that’s nothing short of amazing".

In 2016, NHT released its C Series line of speakers to replace the Classic Series. Secrets of Home Theater Hi-Fi praised the C 3 Bookshelf, saying the speakers "look great, sound great, and measure superbly. And in true NHT tradition, they accomplish all that at a very reasonable price."

== Products ==
=== Traditional Loudspeakers ===
As of May 2018, NHT currently has 3 series of loudspeaker products: the C Series, Media Series, and Super Series.

=== In-ceiling & In-wall speakers ===
NHT utilizes Anti-Resonant Casting for their in-ceiling and in-wall speakers.

NHT uses a patented three-way tweeter array design for their in-ceiling speaker line-up.
