= Sarah Payne (actress) =

British actress and singer

Sarah Payne (born 1959) is a British actress and soprano. She has worked extensively in London's West End, and has played various roles in theatre, comedy, musical theatre, and opera. She is best known for the role of Lina Lamont in the 1983 West End production of Singin' in the Rain; a role for which she was nominated for an Olivier Award.

== Career ==
Payne initially trained as a musician, and studied music at Durham University. She was offered a part in a musical, and within two years she received a Best Actress of the Year in a Musical Olivier Award nomination for creating the role of Lina Lamont in Singin' in the Rain (1983) at London's Palladium Theatre. She returned to that theatre in 1985 in the title role of pantomime Cinderella.

Her major theatre credits also include such shows as The Rocky Horror Show (1979), Barnum (1981), Cricket (1986), The Mystery of Edwin Drood (1987), Risky Kisses (1990), The Marriage of Figaro (1991), Showtune (1998, then titled The Best of Times), High Spirits (2001), and Follies (2006). She also appeared in the 1985 Royal Variety Performance.

Payne sings on the 1986 studio cast recording of the concept musical Josephine, and on the 1992 London concert album of Nine. She sang Donna Elvira in Don Giovanni at the Greenwich Theatre in 1990.
