= David Brooks (actor) =

American actor

- Born: September 24, 1915; Portland, Oregon
- Died: March 31, 1999 (aged 83); Manhattan, New York
- Occupations: Actor, singer, director, producer

David Brooks (September 24, 1915 – March 31, 1999) was an American actor, singer, director, and producer who first drew critical acclamation starring in several Broadway musicals during the 1940s, including portraying Tommy Albright in the original production of Brigadoon.

In the early 1950s he was an important stage director in the avant-garde theatre scene of Milan, Italy. He returned to the United States during the mid-1950s and worked principally as a stage director and producer for over a decade. He was instrumental in producing the United States premieres of a number of works by Eugène Ionesco and Samuel Beckett, and remained active as an actor up until the 1980s.

== Biography ==
Brooks was born in Portland, Oregon, to Jewish parents and earned a Bachelor of Music degree from the University of Washington, where he trained as a classical baritone. He won a scholarship to the Curtis Institute of Music in Philadelphia, where he pursued graduate studies in opera. While a student at Curtis he began appearing in plays and musicals in Philadelphia which ultimately led to his being signed with a talent agent. He made his Broadway theatre debut in 1944 as Jeff Calhoun opposite Celeste Holm as Evalina in the original production of Harold Arlen's Bloomer Girl. The show was a big hit and effectively launched a major career for Brooks as a stage actor and later stage director and producer. L.A. Times on October 11, 1944, headlined "Stage Singer Brooks Signed by Paramount." Scouts had seen him in "Bloomer Girl." Brooks ended up making just one film, in 1944, as a character named Angus McNab in the Paramount musical short "Bonnie Lassie.”

He entered musical theater history on March 13, 1947, when he originated the role of Tommy Albright in the original Broadway production of Lerner and Loewe's Brigadoon at the Ziegfeld Theater. He performed the role 581 times before the production closed on July 31, 1948. After the production ended, Brooks moved to Milan, Italy, where he worked as a director and producer of plays during the early 1950s. While there he became involved with the avant-garde theater scene, notably staging works by Eugène Ionesco and Samuel Beckett.

In 1954 Brooks returned to the United States to portray Tim Cavanaugh in Earl Robinson and Waldo Salt's original musical Sandhog. After the show closed in January 1955, Brooks helped found the theater production company Rooftop Productions. With the company he helped produce the U.S. premieres of Beckett's Endgame, Ionesco's The Bald Soprano and Joyce's Ulysses in Nighttown, all Off-Broadway. He was also active as a director for Off-Broadway productions, and worked with Leonard Bernstein on his 1955 opera Trouble in Tahiti.

Brooks returned to Broadway in 1963 after an eight-year absence to portray Governor Harmon Bardahl in Irving Berlin's Mr. President. He was also the standby performer for President Stephen Decatur Henderson. He returned to Broadway a few more times during his career, portraying Grand Duke Charles in The Girl Who Came to Supper (standby, 1964), Jim in The Sunday Man (1964), the Man in Park (1970), and Judge Paul Barriere in the 1981 revival of Can-Can. He also made a handful of television appearances.

He died at the age of 83 at the Jewish Home and Hospital in Manhattan. He was survived by his longtime life partner Frances Kessler.
