= Kenneth Kantor =

Kenneth L. Kantor

Kenneth L. Kantor is an audio designer and businessman who co-founded the Now Hear This (NHT) speaker company.

Psychoacoustics (the human perception of sound) were of particular interest to Kantor, and this became the underpinnings of much of the design work he has done for several companies.

== Career ==
In 1986 Kantor co-founded and became executive vice president of Now Hear This (NHT), a successful speaker company, based on "Focused Image Geometry", a fundamental new psycho-acoustic technology. He played a key role in formulation of the business, marketing and product development efforts. Other designs include the SuperZero, the first affordable, high end bookshelf speaker according to Stereophile; the industry's first complete, matched home theater system; and a patent for in-ceiling loudspeakers that dramatically improved off-axis frequency response.
