= The Heather on the Hill =

Song from the 1974 musical Brigadoon

"The Heather on the Hill" is a song written by Frederick Loewe, with lyrics by Alan Jay Lerner, for the 1947 musical Brigadoon. In the stage production, set in the Scottish Highlands, the song is sung before the characters of Fiona and Tommy look out towards the loch and mountains.

Gene Kelly recorded it in 1954 with the MGM Studio Orchestra and Chorus under conductor Johnny Green. Andy Williams recorded it in 1962. Instrumental interpretations of the tune appear on albums such as Chet Baker's Chet Baker Plays the Best of Lerner and Loewe (1959), George Shearing's How Beautiful is Night? (1993), Bill Charlap's Distant Star (1996). Russell Malone's Look Who's Here (2000) and Larry Porter's Don't Fence Me In (2018).
