= Bloomer Girl =

- 1944 Original Cast Recording
- Music: Harold Arlen
- Lyrics: E.Y. Harburg
- Book: Sig Herzig and Fred Saidy
- Basis: Unpublished play by Lilith and Daniel Lewis James
- Productions: 1944 Broadway

Bloomer Girl is a 1944 Broadway musical with music by Harold Arlen, lyrics by E.Y. Harburg, and a book by Sig Herzig and Fred Saidy, based on an unpublished play by writer Daniel Lewis James and his wife Lilith. The plot concerns independent Evelina Applegate, a hoop skirt manufacturer's daughter who defies her father by rejecting hoopskirts and embracing comfortable bloomers advocated by her aunt "Dolly" Bloomer, who was inspired by the women's rights advocate Amelia Bloomer. The American Civil War is looming, and abolitionist Evelina refuses to marry suitor Jeff Calhoun until he frees his slave, Pompey.

A television version of the musical was shown in 1956.

== Productions ==
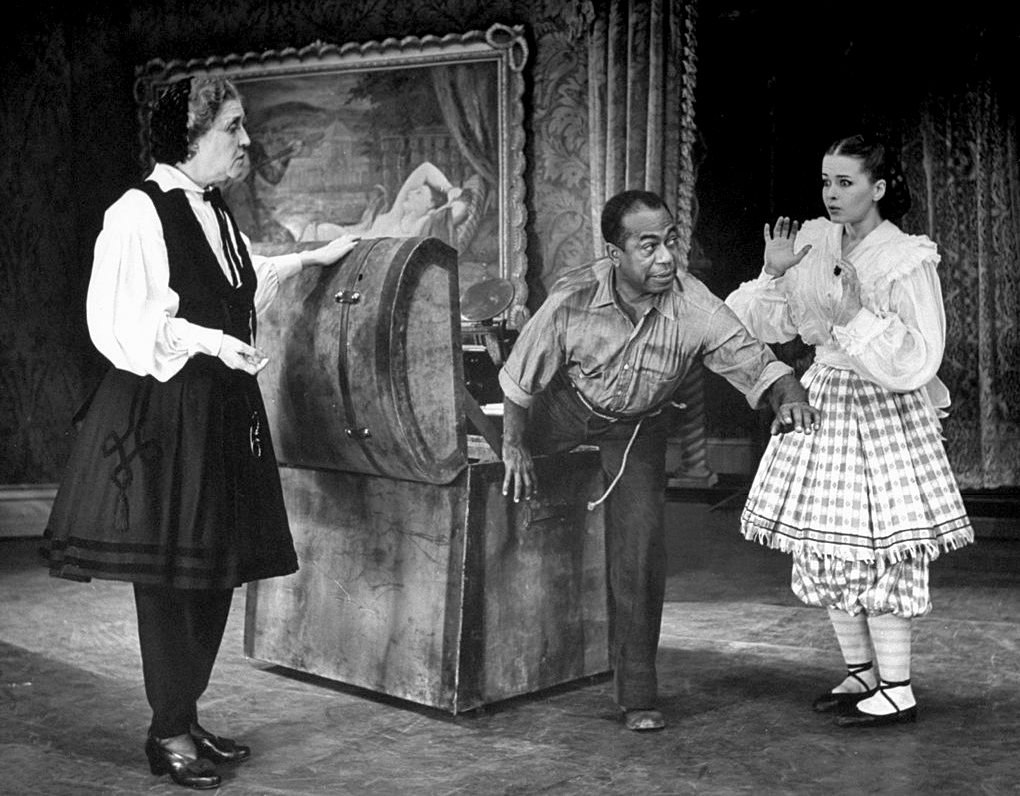
Margaret Douglass (Dolly Bloomer), Dooley Wilson (Pompey) and Joan McCracken (Daisy) in the Broadway production of Bloomer Girl (1944)

The original Broadway production opened at the Shubert Theatre on October 5, 1944, directed by William Schorr and produced by John C. Wilson in association with Nat Goldstone. The production's scenic designer and lighting designer was Lemuel Ayers. Agnes de Mille was the choreographer, and her contributions included a Civil War ballet. The production starred Celeste Holm as Evelina, David Brooks as Jeff Calhoun, Dooley Wilson as the slave Pompey, and Joan McCracken in the featured dancing role as Daisy. While successful—it closed on April 27, 1946, after 657 performances on Broadway—it has seldom been revived.

Alisa Roost directed an Off-Broadway revival, which recreated Agnes deMille's original dream ballet, at the Theatre at St. Clements in 2000 and New York City Center's Encores! staged concert series performed it for a week in 2001.

Bloomer Girl caused a temporary rift between de Mille and Jerome Robbins when, about a year into the show's run, Robbins appropriated several dancers then in the chorus, including James Mitchell and Arthur Partington, for Billion Dollar Baby (1945).

== Musical numbers ==
Act 1

- When the Boys Come Home - Serena, Octavia, Lydia, Julia, Phoebe and Delia
- Evelina - Jeff Calhoun and Evalina
- Welcome Hinges - Serena, Horatio, Lydia, Julia, Phoebe, Delia, Joshua Dingle, Herman Brasher, Ebenezer Mimms, Wilfred Thrush, Hiram Crump, Evalina and Jeff Calhoun
- Farmer's Daughter - Joshua Dingle, Herman Brasher, Ebenezer Mimms, Wilfred Thrush and Hiram Crump
- It Was Good Enough for Grandma - Evalina and the Bloomer Girls
- The Eagle and Me - Pompey
- Right As the Rain - Jeff Calhoun and Evalina
- T'Morra', T'Morra' - Daisy
- Rakish Young Man With the Whiskers - Evalina and Jeff Calhoun
- Pretty As a Picture - Male Ensemble

Act 2

- Sunday in Cicero Falls - Principals and Company
- I Got a Song - Alexander, Augustus and Pompey
- Lullaby - Evalina
- Simon Legree - Second Deputy
- Liza Crossing the Ice - Ensemble
- I Never Was Born - Daisy
- Man For Sale - Soloist
- The Eagle and Me (Reprise) - Ensemble
- When the Boys Come Home (Reprise) - Entire Company

== Recording ==
An original cast album was released on American Decca 78 RPM set DA 381 during the original Broadway run of Bloomer Girl. The recording was re-released on LP in the 1950s. It then remained out of print until the same recording became available on CD in the early 1990s. The [CD] recording restored the second half of Sunday in Cicero Falls, which was deleted from the [LP] due to length.

== Television production ==
An abridged version of the musical, which eliminated most of Agnes de Mille's choreography, except for the dance after "It Was Good Enough For Grandma" and the Civil War ballet, aired on Producers' Showcase in 1956; it starred Barbara Cook and Keith Andes and featured many of the original dancers, including James Mitchell, Lidija Franklin, Betty Low, and Emy St. Just.
