= Tap City =

Festival celebrating tap dance

Tap City: the New York City Tap Festival
- Location: New York City (various locations)
- Founded: July 2001
- Founded by: Tony Waag
- Artistic director: Tony Waag
- Festival date: Held every year over 7 to 10 days in July
- Website: www.atdf.org/tapcity.html

Tap City, the New York City Tap Festival, was launched in 2001 in New York City. Held annually for approximately one week each summer, the festival features tap dancing classes, choreography residencies, panels, screenings, and performances as well as awards ceremonies, concert performances, and Tap it Out, a free, public, outdoor event performed in Times Square by a chorus of dancers. The goal of the Festival is to establish a "higher level of understanding and examination of tap’s storied history and development.”

== History ==
Tap City was designed to bring attention to New York City's tap community. Its first iteration was held from July 7 through July 15, 2001, at various studios and performance spaces around Manhattan. Chaired by Hoagy Carmichael Jr., and Gregory Hines, the Festival began with an open jam session at the Broadway Dance Center in midtown Manhattan. Over the ensuing eight days, an international roster of over 90 performers appeared, which according to the New York Times, writing the day before the event, was to include "well-known tapsters like Jimmy Slyde, Prince Spender of the Four Step Brothers, Brenda Bufalino, Jane Goldberg, Lynn Dally, the Silver Belles and Gregory Hines. Many of the performers will also teach classes."

Venues over the years have included The Joyce Theater, the Duke on 42nd Street, Symphony Space, Chelsea Studios, the Hudson River for a waterborne tap jam, and the amphitheater at the Fashion Institute of Technology.

== Festival highlights ==
Highlights of the festival now include:

=== Tap Awards ===
Film presentations and performances honor recipients of the Hoofer and Tap Preservation Awards and inductees into the International Tap Dance Hall of Fame.

==== International Tap Dance Hall of Fame ====
2002

- Fred Astaire
- Jeni Le Gon
- Baby Laurence Jackson
- Bill 'Bojangles' Robinson
- Eleanor Powell
- John W. Bubbles
- Steve Condos
- The Nicholas Brothers

2003

- Charles 'Honi' Coles
- Chuck Green

2004

- Ann Miller
- Donald O'Connor
- Gregory Hines

2005

- Peg Leg Bates
- Sammy Davis Jr.

2006

- Bunny Briggs

2007

- Eddie Brown
- Leon Collins

2008

- Jimmy Slyde
- Mable Lee
- Two-Man Comedy Tap Team - Cook & Brown
- Two-Man Comedy Tap Team - Stump and Stumpy

2009

- Brenda Bufalino
- The Class Act

2010

- Maurice Hines

2011

- Charles "Cholly" Atkins

2012

- Alice Whitman and the Whitman Sisters' Legacy

2013

- James Buster Brown
- Paul Draper

2014

- Carnell Lyons
- Gene Kelly

2015

- Henry LeTang
- Ray Bolger

2016

- Harriet "Quicksand" Browne
- Master Juba
- Original Copasetics
- Ludie Jones
- The Apollo "Number One" Chorus Line

2017

- Duke Ellington
- The Cotton Club Girls and the Cotton Club Boys

2018

- Ralph Brown
- Tap Happenings

2019

- Ruby Keeler
- The Radio City Music Hall Rockettes
- Dianne Walker

2020

- Arthur Duncan
- The June Taylor Dancers

2021

- Paul and Arlene Kennedy
- Hal Le Roy

=== Annual Copacetic Boat Ride ===
The Festival officially kicks off every year on the Circle Line with performances and a tap jam accompanied by a live jazz band.

=== “Main stage” concert performances ===
The festival includes at least one Mainstage event. Recent iterations include Tap Forward, which featured new work created and performed by soloists, contemporary tap ensembles, new talent and so-called "tap dance masters.”

=== Tap it Out ===
The festival finale, which features hundreds of tappers dancing in tandem in a free public, outdoors event.
