= Brenda Bufalino =

American tap dancer and writer

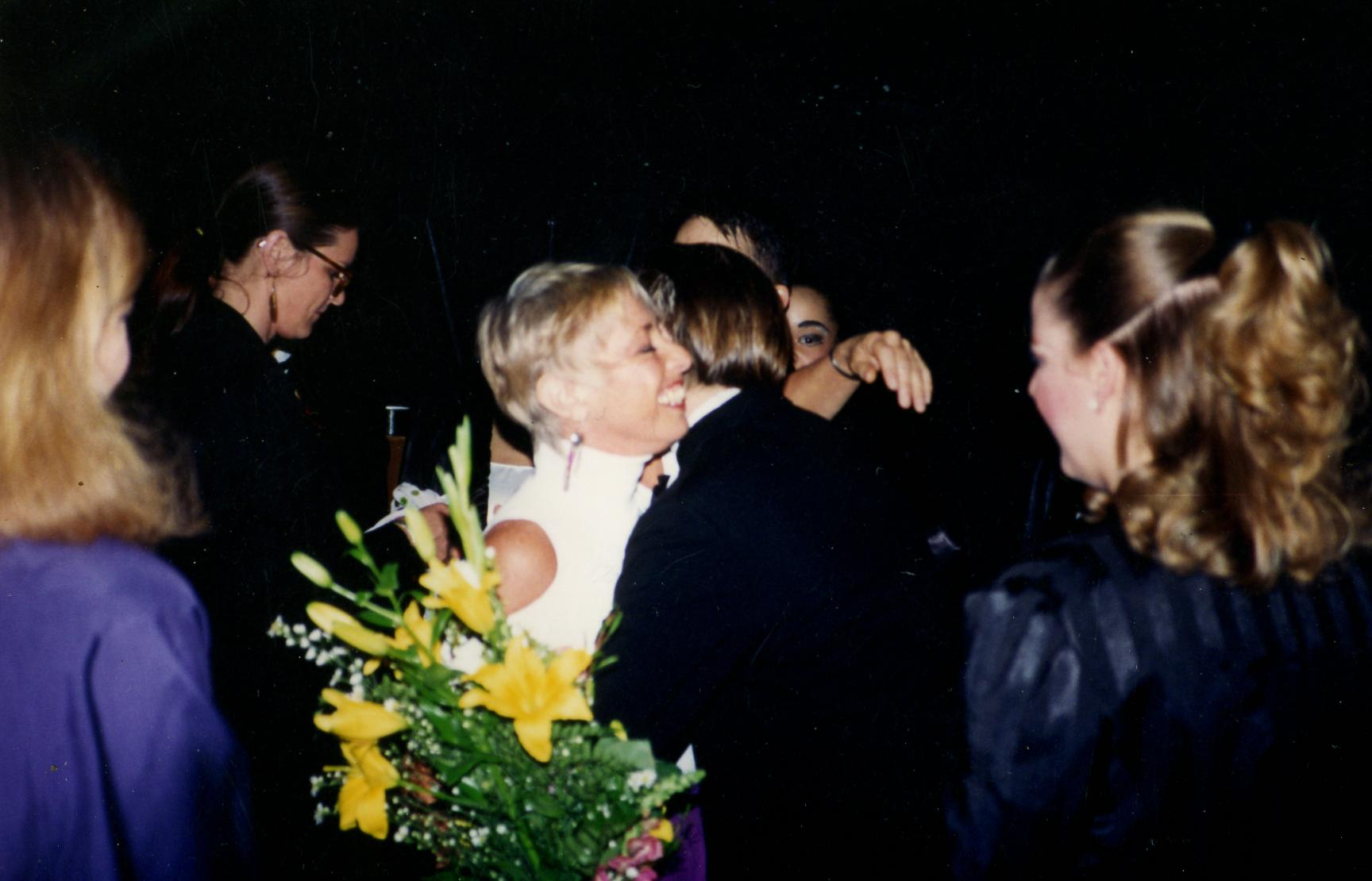
Brenda Bufalino after a performance with The Jefferson Dancers

Brenda Bufalino (born September 7, 1937) is an American tap dancer and writer. She co-founded, choreographed and directed the American Tap Dance Foundation, known at the time as the American Tap Dance Orchestra. Bufalino wrote a memoir entitled, Tapping the Source...Tap dance, Stories, Theory and Practice and a book of poems Circular Migrations, both of which have been published by Codhill Press, and the novella Song of the Split Elm, published by Outskirts Press.

She has been awarded The Flobert Award, The Tapestry Award, The Tap City Hall of Fame Award, The Dance Magazine, and the Bessie Award; all for outstanding achievement and contributions to the field of tap dance.

== Early life ==
Brenda Bufalino was born September 7, 1937, in Swampscott, Massachusetts. She came from a family of performers and by age five she started dancing seriously six days a week at Professor O’Brien’s Normal School of Dancing. She trained in numerous styles, but tap was deeply instilled in her at a young age, “Where I come from, even if you intended a career in ballet, you studied tap first.” As a young girl, Bufalino toured with her mother and aunt in a performing act called The Strickland Sisters. The group combined music, text and movement, and Bufalino would dance while her mother and aunt sangArt Songs.

At age 15, Bufalino commuted to Boston to study at Stanley Brown’s Studio. There she trained in Afro-Cuban, rhythm tap, jazz, and vaudeville styles. In Boston she danced (underaged) at bars with The Bobby Clark Dancers. Each night she would sneak into club rehearsals to listen to New Orleans jazz and the bebop improvisations of saxophone players. Hayes and Bigfords Restaurant became the scene for avant-garde communities to meet and it gave Bufalino her first exposure to conversations about philosophy, literature, and art. Her years in Boston and an intimate exposure to Jazz music came to impact her tap style.

== Career ==
=== New York City ===
Bufalino left for New York City in 1955 to scour the jazz clubs. Shortly thereafter she began dancing at Dance Craft, a dance studio owned by the famous tap dancer Honi Coles. Bufalino was greatly inspired by his emphasis on melody and personality and at age 17 she became Cole's protégé. She was eventually invited to perform with the Copasetics, which included tap legends such as Ernest "Brownie" Brown, Chuck Green, Jimmy Slyde and Howard “Sandman” Sims.

While training with Coles, Bufalino studied jazz with Matt Mattox, modern primitive and afro-cuban with Syvilla Fort, and was an active performer in New York's Vaudeville nightclub circuit. In 1956 she began performing as a popular Calypso artist at Cafe Society. The New York Cabaret laws of the 50’s changed the conditions of live performance and many Cabarets lost their venues. In 1965, Bufalino's frustrations over the direction of the industry caused her to flee the confines of the city and move to New Paltz, NY. There she raised her two children, Jebah Baum and Zachary Baum and spent most of the late 60’s writing poetry and plays.

=== New Paltz and the Avant-garde ===
While in the Hudson Valley, Bufalino reconnected with the composer Ed Summerlin, her longtime friend and collaborator. Summerlin and Bufalino created projects for the National Council of Church, and were actively involved in avant-garde performance art. Although this work didn’t include tap, Bufalino would put tap sounds through a synthesizer and use it in her accompaniment. This period of Bufalino's artistic life was dedicated to experimentation with interpretive dance and it led her to combine her interest in tap with the world of concert performance. Concurrently Bufalino became an adjunct professor at SUNY New Paltz and her affiliation with the university offered opportunities for Bufalino to create modern works such as, Watch the Bouncing Ball, Diary of Samuel and Rosalie, and a film entitled, Traveling. In New Paltz she opened a dance studio called The Dancing Theatre, and started a small dance company. In 1978 Bufalino presented her first major showing of tap choreography at the Pilgrim Theatre titled, Singing, Swinging, and Winging. This piece consisted of three members of her company, with Honi Coles as a guest.

=== Resurgence of Tap ===
Bufalino’s career peaked during the 80’s, and she found herself involved in many different artistic endeavors that spanned all across the globe. Bufalino’s work premiered in both small jazz clubs, such as the Blue Note, and large orchestral settings. After moving back to New York City, Bufalino and Coles reconnected and began working together again. Bufalino played a key role in Coles’ resurface in the tap industry in the 70’s. In the early 80’s she toured with Coles and the Copasetics internationally in London and France, including festivals produced by Avra Petrides in St. Chinian. This was Bufalino’s first exposure to any kind of art festival and led to later inspiration for tap festivals in America. In 1984, Bufalino performed Cantata and the Blues, a solo show that established her tap career further. This performance utilized counterpoint, weight, and complex rhythm.

During this time, Bufalino taught at many studios in NYC and internationally. Additionally, she became heavily involved in the tap festivals (Colorado, Portland, Boston, San Francisco, Houston) around America that were gaining immense popularity at the time. These teaching experiences lead Bufalino to solidify her pedagogy and bring tap dance to people all around America. Eventually, one of her company members, Tony Waag, created Tap City, a Tap festival that brought classes, performances, and tap seminars to New York City.

=== American Tap Dance Orchestra ===
While performing at Blue Note as a soloist, touring with the Copasetics, and making appearances at tap festivals, Bufalino banded together a group of 11 dancers in 1986 to create the American Tap Dance Orchestra (later becoming American Tap Dance Foundation). The concept behind the orchestra was to use different groups of tappers to encompass the many sections of a band or orchestra. Some would be bass, others drums, with a soloist usually carrying the melody. They premiered their first work at the Statue of Liberty 4 July Festival in Battery Park. They later premiered a three and a half minute PBS special performance, Haitian Fight Song, which launched the company into stardom. Following this performance, the company premiered other iconic works such as 42nd Street River to River and The Four Seasons [Jazz version]. Touch, Turn, Return created in collaboration with Carmen Moore premiered in the Judson Church Theater, and is considered Bufalino’s most critically acclaimed avant-garde work. From 1989 to 1995, the company also operated Woodpeckers Tap Dance Center & Inter Arts Space in New York City, and presented on-going classes, performances and related activities. This space was not only for dance, but housed poetry nights, theatrical performances, art galleries, and musical concerts.

The company’s work had an iconoclastic aesthetic that put tap dance on the concert stage. Often appearing in black suits with coat tails, the dancers utilized counterpoint and cacophony in their tapping. Bufalino was very involved in arranging the composition and worked very closely with the musicians that played for their performances. As a director, she was keen on making sure the audience could hear the tappers. She was known to quiet the orchestra by muting the horns, and often played the drums herself so she could control the volume.

== Legacy ==
Recognized as a leading exponent and innovator of jazz tap dance, Bufalino was a pioneer in putting tap dance on the concert stage and challenging the audience to sustain its attention on prolonged rhythmic composition. As a choreographer, Bufalino emphasized story telling, arrangement, choice of composition, and writing in her work. She believed that, “The tap dancer should be integrated with the music.” She was influential in demanding quality microphones, wood floors, lighting, and proper technical needs for tap dancers in both their training and performances.

Bufalino experienced backlash for being a white woman in the tap industry and spent her entire career getting producers and technicians to be on board with her work. Through the challenges, Bufalino’s work eventually created a pallet for how tap dance could be produced and appreciated on the concert stage. As a creator, her work pushed boundaries and blended different types of elements that were previously contrary ideals to the tap industry.
