= Dianne Walker =

- Born: March 8, 1951 (age 75); Boston, Massachusetts, U.S.
- Occupations: Dancer, choreographer
- Years active: 1979–present

Dianne Walker (born March 8, 1951), also known as Lady Di, is an American tap dancer. Her thirty-year career spans Broadway, television, film, and international dance concerts. Walker is the artistic director of TapDancin, Inc. in Boston, Massachusetts.

== Career ==
She began her dance training in Boston with Mildred Kennedy-Bradic and later studied with Leon Collins, Jimmy "Sir Slyde" Mitchell, and Jimmy Slyde. In 1979, she began a professional dance career. She later performed with Collins & Company and became one of the Directors of the Leon Collins Dance Studio, Inc. in Brookline, Massachusetts.

She is considered a pioneer in the resurgence of tap dancing. The Boston Herald has called her "America's First Lady of Tap." Prominent contemporary tap dancer Savion Glover and his peers affectionately call her "Aunt Dianne" in acknowledgment of her unique place as a mentor, teacher, and confidante.

She is often seen in jazz clubs and festivals around the US. A memorable appearance was at the Rainbow Room in New York City with Ruth Brown, Grady Tate, Al McKibbon, and Sir Roland Hanna. Jazz Festival appearances include North Sea (The Hague), Pouri (throughout Europe), Chicago Jazz Festival and Montreal Jazz Festival with Gregory Hines. Dianne was featured in both the original Paris production and the two year Broadway run of Claudio Segovia and Hector Orezzoli's musical Black and Blue. In the Broadway run of the musical she helped adapt Henry LeTang's choreography as assistant choreographer. She is also in the PBS production of Black and Blue directed by Robert Altman. She was the only female to dance in the famed "Hoofers Line" which included Jimmy Slyde, Ralph Brown, Buster Brown, Lon Chaney, Chuck Green, Bunny Briggs, and Savion Glover.

While on Broadway, she performed "Memories of You", a soft shoe choreographed by Cholly Atkins. She was also Assistant Choreographer and Dance Captain for the show's Tony Award winning choreography and recreated choreography for a European tour of Black and Blue. She was featured in Fascinating Rhythms, a thirteen-city Dance Umbrella tour with Jimmy Slyde, Savion Glover, and bucket drummers Drummin Too Deep. She has appeared at the Smithsonian on several occasions honoring such distinguished artists as Cholly Atkins and Jeni Le Gon, and a special lecture/performance entitled "Women in Tap." She also completed a year-long engagement of Savion Glover's Concert Tour, entitled "Footnotes," with Jimmy Slyde, Buster Brown, and Cartier Williams.

She is featured in the motion picture Tap starring Gregory Hines and Sammy Davis Jr., PBS Great Performances' "Tap Dance in America", the documentary Honi Coles: The Class Act of Tap, the documentary Songs Unwritten...Leon Collins, and most recently as the principal commentator in the PBS release JUBA.

Ms. Walker holds a master's degree in education. She has taught at numerous colleges, including Harvard, Williams College, the University of Michigan, and UCLA. She has been the recipient of grants from the National Endowment for the Arts, Massachusetts Cultural Council Jacobs Pillow, and the New England Foundation for the arts. She was a participant in the Dance USA Task Force on Dance Education and in 1997 represented the United States as an adjudicator for the World Tap Dance Championships held in Dresden, Germany. She is on the board of several tap dance organizations and was appointed, by the governor of Massachusetts, to a seat on the board of the Massachusetts Cultural Council, a post she has held since 1996.

She has acknowledged the influence of several major tap dancers on her work, including Honi Coles, Cholly Atkins, Eddie Brown, the Nicholas Brothers, Peg Leg Bates, Steve Condos, Henry LeTang, Prince Spencer, Gregory Hines, and LaVaughn Robinson.

Leon Collins died in 1985, leaving Dianne to continue as one of the directors of his school (1982–1995).

== Awards ==
In 1997 in Boston, she was presented with the Tapestry Award for excellence in teaching from Thelma Goldberg of the Dance Inn in Lexington, Massachusetts. In 1998, she became the youngest dancer and first woman to receive the Living Treasure in American Dance Award from Oklahoma City University. She received the "Savion Glover Award for Keeping the Beat Alive" in St. Louis, Missouri in 2000. In 2003, she received a Flo-Bert Award, presented by the New York Committee To Celebrate National Tap Dance Day, in recognition of her lifetime achievement regarding tap dancing. In 2006, Dianne's lifetime achievements were honored at a luncheon in Flint, Michigan. This award ceremony was sponsored by Tapology, Artistic and executive director, Alfred Bruce Bradley and the Mott Foundation. In 2005, she received another lifetime achievement recognition (Rhythm Bound) from director Sas Selford of the Vancouver Tap Dance Society. In 2004, Walker received the Hoofers Award from Tap City NYC and was also presented with an award in Los Angeles, in memory of Gregory Hines. That same year she was presented with The Humanitarian Award from Jason Samuels Smith of the Debbie Allen Dance Academy.
