= Dormeshia Sumbry-Edwards =

American actress

Dormeshia Sumbry-Edwards at Stockholm Tap Festival 2013

Dormeshia Sumbry-Edwards (born January 16, 1976, in Englewood, California) is an American tap dancer, choreographer, and instructor who has been called "the mastress of her generation." In 1998, she married fellow dancer Omar Edwards and opened a studio with him in Harlem; they have three children.

== Early life and education ==
Sumbry-Edwards began tap dancing at the age of 3 under the instruction of Paul and Arlene Kennedy at the Universal Dance Theatre. At age 8, she performed at the Tip Tap Festival in Rome. At age 12, she made her Broadway debut in Black and Blue, alongside Gregory Hines, Jimmy Slyde, Buster Brown, and Savion Glover. In 1989, the New York Times described her as part of a young generation who "have the certain something." After graduating from high school, Sumbry-Edwards joined Lynn Dally's Jazz Tap Ensemble as a soloist.

== Career ==
Sumbry-Edwards also appeared on Broadway in the Tony Award-winning Bring In Da'Noise, Bring In Da'Funk as the only female tap dancer, initially appearing dressed as a man. She has toured extensively in the United States and abroad.

As an instructor, Sumbry-Edwards has taught on the International Tap Festival circuit including the New York City Tap Festival, the Los Angeles Tap Festival, Stockholm Tap Festival in Sweden, the Campinas Tap Festival, for K-Broadway in Tokyo, and at the Broadway Dance Center in New York City. She is currently on faculty in the dance department at Barnard College.

After her experience hearing responses to her role in Bring In Da'Noise, Bring In Da'Funk alongside male dancers, Sumbry-Edwards decided to think about new ways of teaching techniques of rhythm-tap for women, culminating in a Harlem Tap Studio course for Women in Heels described as "countering the downward-driving, piston-driven attack of traditional (male) rhythm-tapping styles with steps that were structured along more circuitous paths of attack."

Sumbry-Edwards was also a featured performer in Broadway's After Midnight for which she also won an Astaire Award for Best Performance.

== Awards ==
Sumbry-Edwards won a Bessie in 2012 for Outstanding Performer in Jason Samuels Smith's work "Chasing The Bird" performed at The Joyce Theater. She also was the recipient of a dance fellowship in 1994 as well as the prestigious Princess Grace Statue Award in 2017.

== Film and Music Video Work ==
- Tap with Gregory Hines
- Bamboozled, as "Pickaninny Topsy" and Assistant Choreographer
- The Rodgers and Hart Story: Thou Swell, Thou Witty
- Michael Jackson's music video "Rock Your World"
