= Tamangoh Herbin VanCayseele Stanislas =

American tap dancer

Tamangoh Herbin VanCayseele Stanislas (born January 24, 1965) is a French Guianese/American tap dance artist and dance troop organizer.

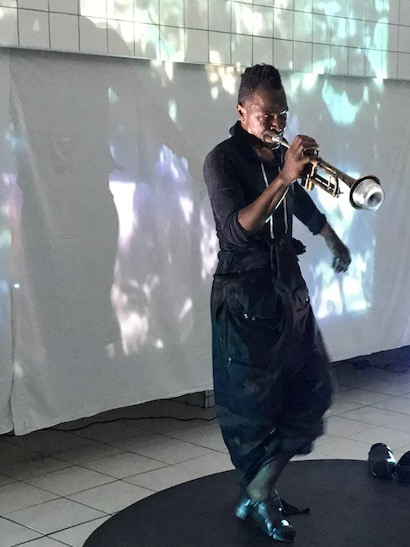
Tamango performing.

== Early years ==
A native of French Guiana, Tamangoh moved to Paris at age nine. He was later adopted at age 15 by Michel van Cayseele, a French baron, who gave him his name Herbin Van Cayseele. Showing early signs of a natural talent for dance, Tamangoh began his formal education in art by entering the École nationale supérieure des Beaux-Arts in Paris.

In his early 20s, Tamangoh started tap dancing at the Mona Bismarck American Center in Paris. He and a group of street musicians formed a group called the Over Excited that toured Europe and in 1988 went to New York.

== Career ==
Tamangoh's first major performances in the early 1990s were the Majesty of Tap at Lincoln Center in New York; Philippe Decoufle's 1992 Winter Olympics in Albertville; and the Opera de Paris in Peut-on Dancer un Paysage, directed by Min Tanaka and Karel Appel. Tamangoh gathered a group of musicians, capoeiristas, dancers and rappers that began to perform in clubs and theaters. In 1993, he founded 'Urban Tap', a theatrical tap dance ensemble. Together with VJ “Naj”Jean de Boysson who provides video backdrops for the dance choreography, the troupe’s multimedia performances include Caravane, Full Cycle (2002), and Bay Mo Dilo (Give Me Water) (2007).

Tamangoh has performed with dancers including Mikhail Baryshnikov, Gregory Hines, Bunny Briggs, Jimmy Slyde, Chuck Green, Buster Brown, Lon Chaney, Sarah Petronio, Tina Pratt and Savion Glover, The Nicholas Brothers, Ralph Brown, George Hillman, and Harriet Brown.

Tamangoh's music collaborators include Bobby McFerrin, David Murray, Chucho Valdes, Christian McBride, Barry Harris, Jimmy Woode, Charlie Hunter, Richard Bona, Cheick Tidiane Seck, Elvin Jones, Giovanni Hidalgo, tabla player Zakir Hussain, Omar Sosa, William Cepeda, Billy Higgins, Frank West, Moroccan Gnawa Master Mahmoud Guinia, Taiko Ensemble KODO, Kodo on Sado Island, Japan, Kaoru Watanabe, Mio Matsuda, Philip Decouflet, and master Senegalese drummer Dou Dou Ndiay Rose, Magic Malik.

== Appearances ==
Tamangoh has appeared at the Joyce Theater and the New Victory Theater in New York.

His music festivals appearances include the Montreaux Jazz Festival, the North Sea Jazz Festival, the Montreal Jazz Festival, the World Sacred Music Festival in Fez, Morocco, and the World Sacred Spirit Festival in Nagaur and Jodhpur, India.
