= LeRoy Myers =

American tap dancer (1919–2004)

- Born: November 10, 1919; North Philadelphia, Pennsylvania, USA
- Died: April 26, 2004; New York City, New York, USA
- Occupation: Tap dancer

LeRoy Myers (November 10, 1919 – April 26, 2004) was an African American tap dancer and manager of the Copasetics. He was born in North Philadelphia, Pennsylvania and learned to tap dance on the street corners of Philadelphia.

When Bill "Bojangles" Robinson died in 1949, LeRoy Myers and some close friends were inspired to form the Copasetics, named after Bill Robinsons' favorite expression, "Everything is Copasetic." The Copasetics was a fraternity of black entertainers that were influential in the revival of tap dancing in the late 1970s through the 1980s. LeRoy Myers was elected as the club's first president. The original membership included Billy Strayhorn, James "Chuckles" Walker, Charles "Cookie" Cook, Luther "Slim" Preston, Henry "Phace" Roberts, Johnny Rocket, Pete Nugent, Honi Coles, Cholly Atkins, Peg Leg Bates, Ernest Brown, Milton Larkin, Francis Goldberg, Frank Goldberg, Emory Evans, Elmer Waters, Roy Branker, Paul Black, Eddie West, and Chink Collins.

LeRoy Myers moved to New York City in the 1930s and was the producer of the weekly tap jam sessions at the Showmans Jazz Club in Harlem. He was the recipient of the 2004 Honi Coles Reward and was going to be honored during Tap Extravaganza 2004 on May 30. He died a month before the Tap Extravaganza from cancer at the age of 84.

To commemorate his accomplishments, on March 11, 2006 the LeRoy Myers Corner street sign, on the northeast corner of 122nd Street and Manhattan Avenue in New York City, was unveiled by LeRoy's only surviving brother, Walter Myers. The ceremony was attended by about 20 relatives that had traveled from Philadelphia, Pennsylvania, as well as Harold "Stumpy" Cromer of the tap team Stump and Stumpy, dancer Norma Miller, and many others.

LeRoy Myers was an honorary board member of the Tap Legacy Foundation (TLF). On May 25, 2006, a commemorative plaque honoring the memory of LeRoy Myers was presented at Showmans by TLF.
