= Howard Sims =

American tap dancer

Howard B. Sims Sr. Sandman Sims
- Sims dancing in his signature sandbox
- Born: January 24, 1917; Fort Smith, Arkansas, U.S.
- Died: May 20, 2003 (aged 86) the Bronx, New York, U.S.
- Occupation: tap dancer
- Years active: 1942–2003
- Spouse(s): Solange A. Sims, 1959–2003 (his death)
- Children: 2

Howard "Sandman" Sims (January 24, 1917 – May 20, 2003) was an African-American tap dancer who began his career in vaudeville. He was skilled in a style of dancing that he performed in a wooden sandbox of his own construction, and acquired his nickname from the sand he sprinkled to alter and amplify the sound of his dance steps. "They called the board my Stradivarius," Sims said of his sandbox.

From the 1950s to the year 2000, Sims was a regular attraction—a "fixture"—at Harlem's noted Apollo Theater, comedically ushering failed acts offstage with a hook, broom or other prop. He was also involved in New York City's Hoofers Club, a venue primarily for black tap dancers.

As part of the resurgence of interest in tap dancing in the 1980s, Sandman Sims served as a cultural ambassador, representing the United States with dance performances around the world. He was featured in the 1989 dance film Tap, along with Sammy Davis Jr., Gregory Hines and Savion Glover, demonstrating classic challenge dancing. Sims also appeared in a 1990 episode of The Cosby Show as Rudy's tap dancing teacher, facing off against Cliff (Bill Cosby) in a good-natured tap challenge.

In her review of the play based on his life, New York Times critic Anna Kisselgoff wrote, "Sims is a virtuoso among virtuosos—in a class by himself. To say Mr. Sims dances on sand is like saying Philippe Petit [the French high wire who gained fame from his illegal walk between the two World Trade Center towers in 1974] is a tightrope walker."

== Early life ==
Sims was born in Fort Smith, Arkansas, on January 24, 1917, one of 12 children. The family soon relocated to Los Angeles, California, where he was raised. Describing his childhood, Sims said, "It was just a whole big dancing family." He learned to dance from his father, and said he was dancing as soon as he could walk. He began tap-dancing at the age of 3. He attributed some of his early love for tap dancing in particular to his mother, exasperated that he kept wearing out the toes of his shoes, putting steel taps on the shoes. Along with his brothers, Sims was dancing on the sidewalks of Los Angeles from a young age. At the age of 14, peeping in the windows of a dance school got Sims arrested for loitering, but he was able to dance his way to freedom, convincing a judge that his reason for being on that street was legitimate.

As a young man, despite his dance talent, Sims aspired to be not a professional dancer, but a professional boxer. After twice breaking his hand, he decided he needed a different means of making a living. Sims had noticed that boxing audiences reacted positively to the way he would dance in the rosin box before getting into the ring, and especially to the distinctive sound his dancing made moving the rosin granules around the wooden box. He began to consider dancing as a career alternative. Sims experimented with several different methods of reproducing the rosin box effect, gluing sandpaper to either his shoes or his dancing mat, but the sandpaper created too much wear on the other surface. Finally he found the solution: loose sand in a low-lipped box. "People went for the scraping sound ... So I made a sound board by sprinkling sand on a flat platform. That was in 1935." His sandbox remained his trademark throughout his career, with some venues even telling Sims, "If you don't bring your sandbox, don't come at all."

During this period, it was common for dancers to carry tap shoes with them and, when they encountered another dancer on the street, throw down their shoes by way of challenge. The culture of street dancing in the 1920s has been compared to the rise of break dancing six decades later. As the journal Jump Cut described it, "'challenge dancing,' in which each performer tries to outdo the other, is part of tap dancing's heritage, something like the jazz solos in which musicians try to outshine one another." Sims later described how the atmosphere of these dance challenges was at least as much collegial as combative, and how dancers learned from one another in what became essentially "open air dance schools". Despite performing at various vaudeville venues, Sims found neither fame nor success as a dancer in Los Angeles. In 1947, he tagged along on one of his professional-boxer friend Archie Moore's cross-country drives, and settled in New York City.

== Harlem ==
After arriving in Harlem, Sims began performing on the street as he had done in California, but faced stiff competition from other innovative dancers: "I knew people who danced on dinner plates. ... There was a man who could dance on newspapers without tearing them. And another who constructed a gigantic xylophone to tap on." He performed on corners in between working whatever jobs he could find, and then discovered the "Amateur Night" stage on Wednesdays at the Apollo Theater, where he soon gained local notoriety. He eventually won the Amateur Night competition a record-breaking 25 times, after which a rule was instituted that performers could no longer compete once they had earned four first prizes.

When big name dancers played The Apollo, there was nothing in the audience but dancers with their shoes," said Sandman Sims. "Up in the balcony dancers, and the first six rows, you saw nothing but tap-dancers, want-to-be tap-dancers, gonna-be tap-dancers, tried-to-be tap-dancers. That's the reason a guy would want to dance at The Apollo.

By the mid-1950s, he had been hired as the Apollo's stage manager, and soon began his role as the Apollo's famed "executioner", chasing Amateur Night contestants the crowd disapproved of off the stage with a shepherd's crook (known since vaudeville times as "the hook") a broom, or other props, while dressed in a variety of wacky costumes, whether long underwear, a clown suit, or even a diaper. Backstage, however, he would console defeated contestants with the story of his having been booed off ten times before he finally got to finish his own act. Sims played "executioner" until 1989, when he departed to California to film "Tap" (he was replaced by James Brown impersonator C. P. Lacey), although one obituary says he stayed on until shortly after Time Warner took over the Apollo in 1999.

Having found work dancing did not stop him from dancing on the street, however. "If I saw a dancer, I'd challenge him. I didn't care who it was. The way to get known in New York was to be the best. That's what I strived to be." Part of the culture of street challenges, as in Los Angeles, was that competing dancers would also learn from one another.

A significant change to Sims's dancing style came about as a result of his interaction with Harlem's hoofers, practitioners of a variation on the tap he had learned on the west coast. Sims later defined the main difference between tap and hoofing as being that tap focuses on the heel and toe whereas hoofers "use the whole foot". As a result of the synergy between hoofing technique and his unique use of a sandbox, his routines were described as being "as rich in sounds and textures as they were in steps." Sims himself put it, "The feet are a set of drums."

Constance Valis Hill, in her 2009 survey Tap Dancing America: A Cultural History, described the hoofers' mecca thusly:

At the Hoofers Club, rookie and veteran, mostly [B]lack male tap dancers assembled to share with, steal from, and challenge each other; there, new standards were set for competition. These were nothing like the formalized buck-dancing competitions of Tammany Hall, where judges sat beside, before, and beneath the stage to evaluate the [dancers'] clarity, speed, and presentation. The Hoofers Club comprised a more informal panel of peers, whose judgments could be cruel and mocking and were driven by an insistence on innovation. "Survive or die" was the credo. In an eccentric fusion of imitation and innovation, young dancers were forced to find their style and rhythmic voice. It was said that on the wall of the Hoofers Club was written: "Thou shalt not copy each other's steps — Exactly."

Though he frequently took opportunities to explain the difference between tap and hoofing to the press in later years, and tended to refer to himself as a hoofer rather than a tap dancer, Sims did practice both forms of dance. In 1949, motivated by the death of Bill "Bojangles" Robinson, Sims became a founding member of the Original Copasetics, another fellowship of tap dancers that became a source of mentor-student relationships and helped bring about the revival of tap in the 1970s and 1980s.

== Decline and revival of tap ==
Tap dancing lost popularity with audiences beginning in the late 1940s. A number of causes factored into this decline, among them the going out of style of vaudeville-style variety shows; a new tax that forced many ballrooms to close and thus closed venues to the big bands with whom tap dancers had used to perform; trends in music that favored smaller, more intimate groups of performers; and concomitant increases in interest among audiences in watching formal modern dance and ballet performances. Sims was quoted as having said of the period that "[t]ap didn't die ... It was just neglected."

With paying gigs harder to find and paying less, Sims turned to other sources of income. Despite not having had any formal instruction himself, he taught dance, including to such later stars as Gregory Hines and Ben Vereen. He also taught footwork to boxing greats Sugar Ray Robinson and Muhammad Ali. Less glamorously, he ran a café, and even worked as a carpenter and a mechanic. Despite the lean times for hoofers, Sims was always able to put food on the table for his family, having married in 1959.

The late 1960s brought the beginning of a wave of nostalgia for tap, and Sims found his dance skills in demand again. In 1969, he was part of the all-star cast of Tap Happening, a revue that played Off-Broadway. Tap Happening was popular enough to run for several years.

The crescendo of interest in tap dancing continued, and in 1972, Sims danced in the production Best of the Hoofers at the Orpheum Theatre. "Hoofing is not a dying art form," he asserted in 1977, and subsequent events proved him right.

1979 saw the release of No Maps on My Taps, which featured Sims facing off against fellow tap stars Chuck Green—who had served as Sims's mentor during his early years in New York—and Bunny Briggs, in a three-way dance challenge. The documentary also reunited him with bandleader Lionel Hampton, whom he had toured with in years past.

In 1980, a far cry from the tiny venues he had been lucky to play just a few years earlier, Sims performed before a crowd of 2,600 fans at the Lincoln Center during the Newport Jazz Festival. Later that year, Sims was one of the instructor-performers of the By Word of Foot "teach-in" series, spending a week demonstrating his hoofing techniques for a new generation of tap enthusiasts.

As part of New York's leg of the 1981 Newport Jazz Festival (which spanned both NYC and its home city of Newport, Rhode Island, that year), he performed with former Cotton Club bandleader Cab Calloway in a production called Stompin' at the Savoy. A few weeks later, Sims was on stage at the American Dance Festival, dancing both with and without his sandbox.

By 1982, Sims was part of a promotional tour reviving interest in No Maps on My Taps with co-stars Bunny Briggs and Chuck Green, their pre-screening performances backed by Cab Calloway. Even as booked performances were coming more regularly, Sims never stopped participating in street-corner challenges, encouraging younger generations of dancers and inviting them to learn his moves.

The National Endowment for the Arts granted Sims a $5,000 National Heritage Fellowship in 1984. "I thought I was making noise all these years," Sims said of the award. "Now they're calling it culture." He used the funds to teach dance to children in Harlem, using a parking lot in lieu of a formal dance studio, drawing on his own youth learning dance on the street. Sims later explained, "most people wait [to study dance] until after they've grown up—and then it's too late." That same year, clogger Ira Bernstein received an NEA Folk Arts Apprenticeship grant "[t]o study traditional [B]lack tap dance with master dancer Howard 'Sandman' Sims." Sims loved to teach; his son recounted how Sandman would "stop every kid he saw and show them a step and get them to copy a step. He enjoyed that more than performing in front of an audience."

=== The Apollo reopens ===
Meanwhile, Harlem's Apollo Theater, where Sims had served for years as Amateur Night's "executioner", had been closed for most of a decade. Then, following an extensive renovation, the venue reopened in 1985, bringing increased attention to both the Apollo and his role there. "I'm their protector, not the executioner," he explained to The Washington Post. "Because that audience can get really hostile." Sims described seeing displeased audiences throw bottles and even horseshoes at performers who he did not hustle off stage fast enough. When The New York Times interviewed him about his "executioner" role, he said of the acts that got booed off, "I tell them to work on their act and come back," encouraging them to try again.

In 1986, Sims starred in The Tap Tradition at Symphony Space New York (which also hosted a showing of No Maps on My Taps), earning a rave review from The New York Times. He also made a brief appearance in a play based on his life, The Sand Dancer, which was written by poet Sandra Hochman and starred LeLand Gantt, and which received another rave review: "Sims is a virtuoso among virtuosos—in a class by himself. To say Mr. Sims dances on sand is like saying Philippe Petit is a tightrope walker." And he traveled to Los Angeles to perform in a production called Essence of Rhythm with fellow tap stars including Charles "Honi" Coles and Jimmy Slyde.

Sandman Sims was the guest star of Late Night with David Letterman on May 14, 1987. It's Showtime at the Apollo, a TV broadcast of the Apollo Theater's Amateur Night performances, began broadcasting in September 1987 on NBC stations, bringing awareness of Sims's "executioner" role to a wider audience.

A particularly busy year, 1988 saw Sims tour the world as a cultural ambassador on behalf of the U.S. State Department, traveling to over 50 countries in a span of 11 months.

By 1989, Sims's popularity was at an all-time high, and he told the Associated Press, "I can't fulfill all the work they give me. ... I can't walk out on the street without somebody showing me a time step." Tap dancing's popularity was nearing a new peak as well, with three major American cities (Houston, Texas; Portland, Oregon; Washington, D.C.) hosting tap-dance festivals. In movie theaters, the dance drama Tap was introducing Sims's footwork (and that of his former student Gregory Hines) to audiences who had never had the opportunity to see him perform before.

Playing a thinly-fictionalized version of himself named "Mr. Sims", Sims made a 1990 appearance on The Cosby Show, then one of the most popular programs on television. "Mr. Sims" was the dance instructor the Huxtables signed their young daughter Rudy up with in order to help her prepare for a class assignment about the Harlem Renaissance. During the episode, Cliff Huxtable (Bill Cosby) challenged "Mr. Sims" to a dance-off, part tribute to and part parody of Sims's real-life tap challenges, which Sims won handily. Later that same year, the Apollo Theater played host to Rat-a-Tat-Tap, another tap-dance festival, and the Sandman, "always a deserved audience favorite at tap festivals," was a featured performer there alongside his Tap co-stars Savion Glover and Gregory Hines.

Sims was a featured performer at the third annual celebration of National Tap Dance Day on May 30, 1993.

In 1998, the New York Committee to Celebrate National Tap Dance Day and the Young People's Tap Conference honored Sandman Sims for his contributions to the art of hoofing.

== In popular culture ==
Sandman Sims, particularly in his role as Apollo Theater executioner, has been referenced frequently in African-American culture.

- A recurring Saturday Night Live sketch featured Chris Rock as "Nat X", a satire on militant black activists. Whenever he was frustrated with a guest, he would call out "Sandman, get him out of here!" Sandman (played by Chris Farley) would enter and "sweep" the offending guest off-stage with his broom.
- On April 5, 2000, he was invoked by Huey Freeman in the long-running comic strip The Boondocks, who responded to an ineptly-told joke by saying, "Where is Sandman Sims when you need him ..."
- Performance artist Holly Bass, along with other dancers, put on another play about Sims's life at the Smithsonian Institution's American History Museum (which was then hosting an exhibit on the Apollo Theater) on July 10, 2010.
- President Barack Obama, referring to his own performance singing on the Apollo Theater stage (albeit not on Amateur Night) the evening before his 2012 State of the Union address, said, "Sandman did not come out!"
- Sims was featured in a bit part in the 1992 television miniseries The Jacksons: An American Dream, set in the 1960s when the Jackson 5 performed at amateur night at the Apollo. Prior to the Jacksons going onstage, a group called "The Gems" is singing poorly, to the audience's disdain. The MC calls for Sandman to get on stage, to which the character is in the balcony and uses a rope to swing down, then uses cap guns to usher the Gems offstage. This intimidates the young Michael Jackson into concern he will suffer similar mortification.

== Personal life ==
While Sims had a first marriage which produced his first child Diane Sims, he later married his second wife, Solange Elfassi, in 1966. They had a son together, Howard Sims Jr., as well as five grandchildren and a great-grandchild.

Particularly in later years, Sims sometimes claimed not to be certain of his birth year, at times saying it was "a matter of opinion." Asked by a fan how old he was, Sims once replied, "Any number can play."

Sims died on May 20, 2003, in New York City. He had suffered from Alzheimer's disease. A memorial service for Sims was held May 28, 2003, at the Apollo Theater.

== Filmography ==
- No Maps on My Taps (1979) – Himself
- Uptown: A Tribute to the Apollo Theatre (1980) – Himself
- The Cotton Club (1984) – Hoofer
- Motown Returns to the Apollo (1985) – Himself
- The Kennedy Center Honors: A Celebration of the Performing Arts (1987) — Himself
- It's Showtime at the Apollo (1987–2000) – Himself / the "executioner"
- Harlem Nights (1989) – Crapshooter
- Tap (1989) – Sandman
- Tap Dance in America (1989) – Himself
- The Cosby Show (1990) – season 6, episode 19, "Mr. Sandman" – Mr. Sims
