= The Bridge Stage of the Arts =

American theater company

The Bridge Stage of the Arts, Inc.
- Formation: 1980
- Type: Intercultural, inter-disciplinary theater production company
- Legal status: not-for-profit organization (501(c)(3))
- Purpose: To further collaborative creation of new theatrical hybrids by spanning different disciplines, cultures and generations; and to provide educational programs.
- Headquarters: New York City, New York
- Location: New York City, New York
- Region served: International
- Official language: English
- Founder and Artistic Director: Avra Petrides (November 21, 1938- )

The Bridge Stage of the Arts, Inc. (The Bridge) was started by its Artistic Director, Avra Petrides, in 1980; and has produced music-theater festivals in the South of France with American musical-theater artists such as Alan Jay Lerner, lyricist and librettist of My Fair Lady, and Betty Comden and Adolph Green screenwriters and lyricists of Singin' In The Rain. These artists performed and also gave master classes on musical theater to lyricists, librettists, playwrights, composers, directors, and performers from all over the world.

In Lower Manhattan The Bridge has presented Performance-Forums in which theater artists collaborate on productions with astrophysicists, philosophers, architects and others working in a variety of disciplines. Also, in Lower Manhattan, The Bridge produced Hart & Hammerstein Centennial Plus One which re-introduced Castle Clinton as a noteworthy performance space.

== Purpose ==
The purpose of The Bridge is to further collaborative creation of new theatrical hybrids by spanning different disciplines, cultures and generations; and to provide educational programs in the performing and visual arts.

== Notable productions ==
In the South of France, The Bridge presented Alan Jay Lerner and Liz Robertson In Concert, Honi Coles and The Copasetics In Concert, and Betty Comden and Adolph Green In Concert. In Lower Manhattan, The Bridge has produced its Performance-Forums with astrophysicist, Neil deGrasse Tyson, theater director, Tom O'Horgan and others. And in June 2001, it presented Hart & Hammerstein Centennial Plus One at Castle Clinton, near the World Trade Center in Lower Manhattan. The production was the first of a summer concert series, and marked the first time in 146 years that Castle Clinton had been used as a theater. Castle Clinton, a 215-year-old circular stone garrison built in 1811 to protect New York from the warring British, has served as an indoor garden, an opera house, an aquarium, an immigrant landing depot, and the setting in which the "Swedish Nightingale" Jenny Lind made her 1850 American debut, courtesy of P.T. Barnum; also, in recent years, as a ticket booth for ferries to the Statue of Liberty.

== Founder and artistic director ==
Before becoming Artistic Director of The Bridge, Avra Petrides worked as an actress in Canadian Broadcasting Company's television adaptation of Ansky's The Dybbuk in Adrienne Kennedy's A Movie Star Has To Star in Black and White, directed by Joseph Chaikin at Joseph Papp's Public Theater; and on Broadway. As a playwright, her work has been presented in New York at La Mama Experimental Theater Club, the Manhattan Theater Club, the WPA Theater, The New Dramatists and recorded on WBAI. She co-wrote and directed the cabaret production, Dietrich for the Oak Room in the Algonquin Hotel, which won a MAC Award. And Ms. Petrides directed Tap Divas and the tap dance extravaganza Tap City with Gregory Hines, Savion Glover, Brenda Bufalino and others, which played at the Doris Duke Theater in Times Square.

== History ==
The Bridge Stage of the Arts, Inc., was incorporated in New York City in 1980 as a not-for-profit organization. It was then known as The Bridge American Theater Festival, Inc. In 1995, its title was changed to The Bridge Stage of the Arts, Inc. The Bridge works on a project by project basis.

=== Festival in south of France ===
Although based in Manhattan, in the 1980s, The Bridge produced summer music theater festivals in the south of France, with an emphasis on the American musical theater. Alan Jay Lerner (lyricist, librettist, My Fair Lady, Camelot), Comden and Green, lyricists-screenwriters (Singin' in the Rain, Will Rogers Follies) tap dancer Honi Coles, (Tony Award winner, My One and Only), Virgil Thomson, (critic and composer, Four Saints in Three Acts), members of the American Dance Machine and of Joseph Chaikin's experimental The Open Theater, and others performed at night and taught master classes during the day. Each summer, through the invitation of The Bridge and the International Theatre Institute, (a branch of UNESCO), 150 actors, singers, dancers, choreographers, playwrights, composers, directors and lyricists and librettists from, at times, 22 countries including France, China, Australia, Ethiopia, Madagascar, America and Japan came to partake free of charge in The Bridge programs. The performances attended by an international audience were sold out.

The festivals' first site, in 1982, was a restored 17th century factory, in the small, medieval township of Saint-Chinian, South of France, (Languedoc-Roussillon region), where the uniforms of Louis XIV's regiments were once embroidered. In 1984, The Bridge Festival moved to the nearby walled medieval city of Beziers also in the Languedoc-Roussillon region of the South of France.

Betty Comden and her partner, Adolph Green, the prolific lyricists and librettists of Broadway and film musicals such as Singin' In The Rain and On the Town, were participants in the festival. In 1985 Comden wrote about the Bridge for The Dramatists Guild:

The concept of The Bridge, a yearly workshop and festival devoted to the American musical, to be located in France ... was to be literally a bridge between countries and cultures to disseminate knowledge on the subject by assembling "stagères", working participants from all over the globe, and bringing over from America leading practitioners of musical theater to do the disseminating. Her dream was that some day in the future, for example, if Hal Prince wanted to experiment with Japanese Noh players, working with a Swedish lyricist, a Yugoslavian composer, and a Bessarabian choreographer, such an international collaboration would be assembled under the auspices of The Bridge. This is but a facetious example of the possibilities. Avra Petrides has a strong and sincere feeling about the need for open communication through the arts among the many diverse cultures of our all too unpeaceful world, and hopes The Bridge will help.

=== Performance-Forums ===
In 1996, in Lower Manhattan, The Bridge initiated its Performance- Forums in the Art Deco "Cocoa" building at No.1 Wall Street. In this series, American/international theater artists collaborate with astrophysicists, sculptors, theologians, philosophers, poets, novelists, painters, musicians, choreographers, filmmakers, and others working in a variety of creative, scientific and intellectual disciplines. The aim: to better understand each other's endeavors and find new and exciting ways to combine them in stage production. The theme of the initial Performance-Forum was Time (as perceived by people in different disciplines and cultures.)

For several months prior to this event these people collaborated on a performance based on that theme:

- Tom O'Horgan, Theater director of the Broadway productions Hair, Jesus Christ Superstar, Lenny, Inner City; director for the Vienna State Opera, New York City Opera; and co-author of Senator Joe at the Neil Simon Theater on Broadway.
- Neil de Grasse Tyson, Ph.D. Astrophysicist and Director of the Hayden Planetarium.
- Michael Sherman, A futurist, who was advising governments and corporations on their long-range plans. He has made a comparative study of images of time in modern culture.
- Min Tanaka, International choreographer and Butoh dancer.
- Tony Rothman, Ph.D. Physicist specializing in cosmology, who has been on the Editorial Board of Scientific American, and a Pulitzer Prize nominee.
- Kirk Nurock, Composer/pianist, who has played with Phil Woods, Chet Baker, Dizzy Gillespie and Donald Byrd. His compositions and arrangements have been performed by Judy Collins, Dizzy Gillespie, Dick Hyman, Bette Midler, Jane Ira Bloom, The Brecker Brothers and Jay Clayton.
- Serge Gubelman, who has been playing the Didgeridu since the 70's.
- R.M. Fischer, Sculptor and installation artist, whose work is in the permanent collections of the Museum of Modern Art, the Whitney Museum of American Art, The Cincinnati Art Museum, and the Dallas Museum of Art, among others. His public installations include Rector Gate at Battery Park City and the Kansas City Sky Stations.
- Brenda Bufalino, Tap dancer and Founder of the American Tap Dance Foundation, who has performed as a soloist at Carnegie Hall, Avery Fisher Hall, the Smithsonian Institution, the Kennedy Center and on PBS' Great Performances series; and-
- Theo Bleckmann, Vocalist and composer who has worked with Philip Glass, Anthony Braxton, Elliott Sharp, Meredith Monk and Kirk Nurock.

This debut Performance-Forum, given on March 28, 1996, was attended by approximately two hundred artists, scientists and philosophers, who, at its conclusion, participated in the Forum, which took the form of a panel-led discussion on the evening's theme Time.

=== Castle Clinton redux ===
In 1996, The Bridge re-introduced the 19th century reddish circular stone structure in Historic Battery Park, Castle Clinton, as a performance space with the production Hart and Hammerstein Centennial Plus One. It was hosted by CBS' Charles Osgood, the event featured leading singers and Rob Fisher, then musical director of the Encores! series at the New York City Center. It was the first performance at Castle Clinton since the mid-1800s. For the production, The Bridge erected a 30-inch high stage and installed a translucent white tent to protect against rain.
