= Basin Street Revue =

- Directed by: Joseph Kohn; Leonard Reed
- Written by: Ben Frye (continuity); Leonard Reed (dialogue)
- Produced by: Ben Frye (producer)
- Starring: See below
- Cinematography: Don Malkames
- Edited by: Arthur Rosenblum
- Music by: Frank Foster
- Release date: 1956
- Running time: 40 minutes
- Country: United States
- Language: English

Basin Street Revue is a 1956 American film directed by Joseph Kohn and Leonard Reed. The film is also known as Basin Street Review (American TV title).

== Cast ==
- Willie Bryant as himself
- Sarah Vaughan as herself
- Lionel Hampton as himself
- Paul Williams as himself
- Jimmy Brown as himself
- Amos Milburn as himself
- Faye Adams as herself
- Charles "Honi" Coles as himself
- Cholly Atkins as himself
- Herb Jeffries as himself
- Cab Calloway as himself

Count Basie, The Clovers, Nat "King" Cole, Martha Davis, Frank Foster, Mantan Moreland, Nipsey Russell and Marie Bryant also appear.
