= Who's Afraid of Virginia Woolf? =

1962 play by Edward Albee

- 1962 Broadway windowcard
- Original language: English
- Written by: Edward Albee
- Characters: Martha; George; Nick; Honey
- Subject: Marital strife
- Genre: Drama
- Setting: Martha and George's New England home

Premiere
- Date: October 13, 1962
- Place: Broadway – Billy Rose Theatre

Who's Afraid of Virginia Woolf? is a play by Edward Albee first staged in October 1962. It examines the complexities of the marriage of middle-aged couple Martha and George. Late one evening, after a university faculty party, they receive unwitting younger couple Nick and Honey as guests, and draw them into their bitter and frustrated relationship.

The three-act play normally takes just under three hours to perform, with two 10 minute intermissions. The title is a pun on the song "Who's Afraid of the Big Bad Wolf?" from Walt Disney's Three Little Pigs (1933), substituting the name of the celebrated English author Virginia Woolf. Martha and George repeatedly sing this version of the song throughout the play.

Who's Afraid of Virginia Woolf? won both the 1963 Tony Award for Best Play and the 1962–1963 New York Drama Critics' Circle Award for Best Play. It is frequently revived on the modern stage. The film adaptation was released in 1966, written by Ernest Lehman, directed by Mike Nichols, and starring Richard Burton, Elizabeth Taylor, George Segal, and Sandy Dennis.

== Plot summary ==
=== Act One: "Fun and Games" ===
George is an associate professor of history, and his wife Martha is the daughter of the president of the college where George teaches. After they return home from a faculty party, Martha reveals she has invited a young married couple she met at the party over for a drink. (Also cut in the definitive edition: Just before the couple—Nick and Honey—arrive, George gives a vague warning about "the bit with the kid" that Martha appears to understand.)

As the four drink, Martha and George engage in scathing verbal abuse of each other in front of Nick and Honey. These interactions embarrass the younger couple, but they stay. At one point, Honey lets on that Martha told her about their son, which appears to unnerve George. After this, Martha's taunts and George's passive aggression only increase. When Martha launches into an embarrassing story about how she humiliated him with a sucker punch at a backyard party, George disappears. The story continues, with Nick and Honey laughing, until George appears with a rifle and fires at Martha. To their surprise, a Chinese parasol pops out of the gun barrel. Everyone finds this extremely funny, but Martha quickly resumes her taunting of George, which culminates in Martha relating how her father had thought that George would eventually rise to lead the college, but George's lack of ambition has made him pathetic to Martha, who calls him a "great big fat flop". George reacts violently by breaking a bottle. Honey, who has grown more and more deliriously drunk, quickly runs to the bathroom to vomit, leaving George alone with glass all over the room.

=== Act Two: "Walpurgisnacht" ===
(Traditionally, "Walpurgisnacht" is the name of an annual witches' meeting, satiric in the context of the play.)

Nick returns to find George alone. As they talk about their wives, Nick reveals that Honey once had a "hysterical pregnancy". George tells Nick about a time he went to a gin mill with some boarding school classmates, one of whom had accidentally killed his mother by shooting her. This friend was mocked for ordering "bergin" (bourbon). The following summer, the young friend was driving with his father and suddenly swerved to avoid a porcupine, accidentally killing his father. The boy was then sent to an asylum and became mute. As the story concludes, George and Nick discuss children, but the conversation turns insulting before Martha and Honey return.

Honey calls for music, so they put on a record. Because George refuses to dance, Martha dances with Nick, taunting George by making the dance very sensual while she tells another embarrassing story about George: his efforts to publish a novel about a boy who accidentally killed both of his parents (with the insinuation that the deaths were actually murder), but Martha's father would not let it be published. Nick begins detecting the novel's resemblance to the story George shared with him about his boarding school classmate, right as Martha mentions that he had written the novel to be autobiographical, quoting George on how he'd informed her father that it recollected events that had happened, personally, to him. George attacks Martha, but Nick separates them. Clearly not satisfied, George launches into a new "game" called "Get the Guests", in which George begins telling a story about a "mousie" that is a thinly veiled retelling of everything Nick told George about Honey, including her alcoholism and her "hysterical pregnancy", implying that Honey "trapped" Nick into marrying her by pretending to be pregnant. Honey, devastated, again runs to the bathroom to vomit.

Martha begins to openly seduce Nick in the living room right in front of George, who blithely smiles and pretends to read a book. This greatly annoys Martha, who tells George that if he does nothing to stop her, she'll have sex with Nick. George is unmoved, so Martha goes upstairs with Nick. Immediately, an enraged George throws his book against the house's doorbell chimes, which ring out as he promises to make Martha "regret this."

In some productions until 2006, Honey then returns, wondering who rang the doorbell. George then interrogates Honey about her pregnancy, then openly tells Honey that he is going to inform Martha that their son has died. In a 2006 revision by the author of the script, however, this scene is cut.

=== Act Three: "The Exorcism" ===
(Exorcism is the expulsion or attempted expulsion of a supposed evil spirit from a person or place.)

Martha enters an empty living room and shouts for the others to come out of hiding. Nick joins her. The doorbell rings, and George enters carrying snapdragons and making literary jokes that Martha seems to actually enjoy. Martha and George then argue about whether the moon is up, an odd game whose metaphors reveal that Nick was too drunk to have sex with Martha upstairs.

George asks Nick to bring Honey back for the final game, "Bringing Up Baby". Nick and Honey sit helplessly as George, at last, talks openly about his and Martha's son. As he accuses Martha of being overbearing to their son, she protests, leading George to ask for her "recitation". Martha agrees, and begins to recall their son's beauty and talents and accuses George of ruining his life. As she speaks, George recites sections of the Libera me (part of the Requiem Mass, the Latin mass for the dead) and Kyrie eleison (ancient Greek: "Lord, have mercy").

This continues until George informs Martha that the doorbell earlier was a messenger from Western Union arriving with a telegram that George says informed him that their son was dead, having been killed in a car crash when he swerved to avoid a porcupine—the exact wording that George earlier used in a story about a completely different person. Martha demands proof, but George insists on the reality of the situation. Martha, distraught, collapses. It slowly dawns on Nick that the son George and Martha have been talking about is not real. The fictional son is a "game" the two have been playing since discovering early in their marriage that they are infertile. George has decided to "kill" him because Martha broke the game's single rule: not to mention the boy to anyone else.

Overcome with pity, Nick and Honey leave. Martha suggests that they could invent a new imaginary child, but George insists they cannot. The play ends with George singing "Who's afraid of Virginia Woolf?", a joke song someone sang that night at the faculty party. Martha weakly replies, "I am, George. I am."

== Themes ==
=== Reality and illusion ===
Albee has said that the title of the play "means who's afraid of the big bad wolf ... who's afraid of living life without false illusions." Albee's interest in the theme of reality versus illusion is expressed in a number of his plays. In discussing Who's Afraid of Virginia Woolf? he cites Nietzsche's interpretation of the Apollonian/Dionysian dichotomy of ancient Greek drama, as described in The Birth of Tragedy. Albee says,

There was a time when people believed in deities. And then revolutions came – industrial, French, Freudian, Marxist. God and absolutes vanished. Individuals find this very difficult and uncomfortable. All they have left is fantasy or the examination of the self.

According to Lawrence Kingsley, Albee's characters create illusions to help them evade feelings of their own inadequacy – as "George and Martha have evaded the ugliness of their marriage by taking refuge in illusion." The play demonstrates "how his characters must rid themselves of falsehood and return to the world in which they must live."

The distinction between truth and illusion is at times deliberately unclear. The existence of the child, the "murder" by George of his parents, or Honey's "pregnancy" may be illusions, but they seem real to the characters. Illusions may be exorcised in the play, but no truth or apparent reality is supplied in its place. "All truth", George says, "[becomes] relative".

=== Critique of societal expectations ===
Christopher Bigsby asserts that this play opposes the idea of a perfect American family and societal expectations as it "attacks the false optimism and myopic confidence of modern society". Albee takes a heavy-handed approach to displaying this contrast, making examples of every character and their expectations of the people around them. Societal norms of the 1950s consisted of a nuclear family: two parents and two (or more) children. This conception was picturesque in the idea that the father was the breadwinner, the mother a homemaker, and the children well-behaved.

Who's Afraid of Virginia Woolf? smashes these conventions and shows realistic families that are far from perfect and possibly ruined. The families of Honey and Martha were dominated by their fathers, with no sign of a mother figure in their lives. George and Martha's chance at a perfect family was ruined by infertility and George's failure to become a prominent figure at the university.

== Inspirations ==
=== Title ===
The play's title alludes to the English novelist Virginia Woolf. She died by suicide at age 59 in 1941. She left behind a note in which she expressed love for her husband Leonard Woolf and sorrow for the anguish she was causing him. Twenty years later, playwright Edward Albee corresponded with him, asking permission to use his late wife's name in the title of a new play, according to literary critic Leon Edel, an acquaintance of Leonard Woolf. Woolf granted permission, according to Edel.

Edward Albee's title also pokes fun at the song "Who's Afraid of the Big Bad Wolf?" from Walt Disney's animated version of The Three Little Pigs. Because the rights to the Disney song are expensive, most stage versions, and the film, have Martha sing to the tune of "Here We Go Round the Mulberry Bush", a melody that fits the meter fairly well and is in the public domain. In the first few moments of the play, it is revealed that someone sang the song earlier in the evening at a party, although who first sang it (Martha or some other anonymous party guest) remains unclear. Martha repeatedly needles George over whether he found it funny.

Albee described the inspiration for the title:

I was in there [at a saloon in New York] having a beer one night, and I saw "Who's afraid of Virginia Woolf?" scrawled in soap, I suppose, on this mirror. When I started to write the play it cropped up in my mind again. And of course, who's afraid of Virginia Woolf means who's afraid of the big bad wolf – who's afraid of living life without false illusions. And it did strike me as being a rather typical, university intellectual joke.

The title phrase happened to appear five years before the play's premiere, in a 1957 issue of The New Yorker:

A coffee fiend we know dropped into an espresso joint in Greenwich Village the other day and found himself whiling away his time reading the graffiti on the wall beside his chair. Most of the stuff was pretty humdrum, but he was arrested by a legend, done in elegant calligraphy, that read, "Who's afraid of Virginia Woolf?"

The New Yorker responded in 2013 by suggesting that perhaps the graffito that Albee saw was the same graffito that The New Yorker reported in 1957.

=== Characters ===
In an interview, Albee said Martha and George were based on two of his friends, married New York socialites Willard Maas and Marie Menken. Maas was a professor of literature at Wagner College and Menken was an experimental filmmaker and painter. Maas and Menken were known for their infamous salons, where drinking would "commence at 4 pm on Friday and end in the wee hours of night on Monday" (according to Gerard Malanga, an Andy Warhol associate and friend to Maas). The primary conflict between George and Martha in Who's Afraid of Virginia Woolf? derived from Maas's and Menken's tempestuous and volatile relationship.

== Production history ==
=== Original production ===
The print edition of the play was published in 1962 and was one of the early releases of Atheneum Books. It sold over 70,000 copies in hard and soft cover editions.

Who's Afraid of Virginia Woolf? opened on Broadway at the Billy Rose Theatre on 13 October 1962. The original cast featured Uta Hagen as Martha, Arthur Hill as George, Melinda Dillon as Honey, and George Grizzard as Nick. It was directed by Alan Schneider. Subsequent cast members included Henderson Forsythe, Eileen Fulton, Nancy Kelly, Mercedes McCambridge, Elaine Stritch and Rochelle Oliver.

Because of the play's unusual length (over three hours), the producers also cast a matinee company that performed twice a week, featuring Kate Reid as Martha, Shepperd Strudwick as George, Avra Petrides as Honey, and Bill Berger as Nick. As with the evening company, these matinee performances also sold out.

The play closed on 16 May 1964, after 5 previews and 664 performances. It opened in London in 1965, starring Constance Cummings and Ray McAnally. Virginia Woolf's widower Leonard attended a performance and enjoyed it, according to an acquaintance of his, literary critic Leon Edel.

==== Original Broadway cast album ====
In 1963, Columbia Masterworks released a four-LP boxed recording of the original Broadway cast performing the entire play, directed by Alan Schneider.

The release contained a 16 page booklet with photos from the original production, critical essays by Harold Clurman and Walter Kerr, cast and crew biographies, and a short article by Goddard Lieberson on the task of recording the play. The introduction is by Albee, in which he writes, "I cannot conceive of anyone wanting to buy [this] massive album; but ... every playwright wants as much permanence for his work as he can get."

The recording was issued in both stereo (DOS 687) and monaural (DOL 287) formats. It was out of print for many years, was not released in other formats, and is highly prized among collectors, as a play with such adult themes had never been recorded for the general public before. It was finally re-released in 2014 by Masterworks Broadway.

=== Notable productions ===
In 1970, Henry Fonda and Richard Burton attempted to recruit Warren Beatty and Jon Voight for an all-male production, but Albee refused permission.

Colleen Dewhurst and Ben Gazzara starred in a 1976 Broadway revival directed by Albee.

Mike Nichols and Elaine May starred in a 1980 production in New Haven.

Diana Rigg and David Suchet starred in a 1996 production of the play at the Almeida Theatre in London before transferring to the Aldwych Theatre in London's West End in 1997.

Patrick Stewart and Mercedes Ruehl starred in a 2000–2001 production at The Guthrie Theater in Minneapolis.

In 2001, Howard University cast an all African American cast in a school production. They received permission from Albee to change some of the language to be more fitting to a black family in the 1960s. Albee attended one of the performances and said that he enjoyed it. This version was revived in 2025 by the Portland Stage Company in Maine with the same actor playing George as in the 2001 version.

The play was revived on Broadway at the Longacre Theatre, opening on 12 March 2005, in previews and closing on 4 September 2005, after 8 previews and 177 performances. Directed by Anthony Page, it starred Kathleen Turner as Martha and Bill Irwin as George, with Mireille Enos as Honey and David Harbour as Nick. Irwin won the 2005 Tony Award for Best Performance by a Leading Actor in a Play for his role. The production transferred to London's West End at the Apollo Theatre with the entire original cast, running from 31 January to 13 May 2006. In January 2007, the production played at the Kennedy Center in Washington, DC, for one month. On 6 February 2007, the production began a six-week run at the Ahmanson Theatre in Los Angeles.

Notably, it was this 2005 production that led to the publication of a revised script – one that has been used ever since – although many of its revisions were introduced in earlier productions. Among the revisions was the removal of early references to George and Martha's son, as well as the reference to the fact that George felt that he helped cause his parents' death, which was originally the subject of his failed novel. A roughly 7 page scene with George and Honey at the end of Act II has also been removed completely. These and other changes seem to be there to clarify plot points, but arguably rob the play of some of its ambiguity and tenuous relationship with realism.

The play toured in the US and played in San Francisco at the Golden Gate Theatre from 11 April – 12 May 2007.

On 12 December 2010, the Steppenwolf Theatre in Chicago began performances of the play featuring Amy Morton as Martha, Tracy Letts (the Pulitzer Prize-winning playwright of August: Osage County) as George, Carrie Coon, and Madison Dirks. The production was directed by Pam MacKinnon, who previously directed the premieres of Albee's Peter and Jerry and Occupant. This production began previews on Broadway at the Booth Theatre on 27 September 2012, opening on 13 October, 50 years after the original Broadway opening. MacKinnon again directed, with the Steppenwolf cast reprising their roles. The production and cast received praise in The New York Times from reviewer Charles Isherwood. Letts won the 2013 Tony Award for Best Performance by a Leading Actor in a Play.

Meg Tilly returned to acting in 2011 to play Martha in a production by Blue Bridge Repertory Theatre. The show ran from 5 July – 17 July 2011, in Victoria, British Columbia.

On 21 February 2017, a production directed by James Macdonald began at the Harold Pinter Theatre in London, featuring Imelda Staunton, Conleth Hill, Imogen Poots, and Luke Treadaway. It ran until 27 May 2017.

A Broadway revival was scheduled to premiere on 9 April 2020, in a production directed by Joe Mantello and produced by Scott Rudin. It starred Laurie Metcalf, Rupert Everett, Russell Tovey, and Patsy Ferran. Eddie Izzard had been set to play George, but it was announced on 11 September 2019, that Everett would replace her. It was canceled due to the COVID-19 pandemic after 9 preview performances, without officially opening.

Curve was set to stage a revival in Autumn 2025 starring Cathy Tyson.

A widely praised production directed by Sarah Goodes and starring Kat Stewart as Martha, David Whteley (Stewart's real-life husband) as George, Harvey Zielinski as Nick, and Emily Goddard as Honey was staged at the Red Stitch and Comedy theatres in Melbourne in 2023–24 and at the Sydney Theatre Company in 2025.

Oxford Playhouse staged a revival in February 2026, starring Katy Stephens as Martha, Matthew Pidgeon as George, Ben Hall as Nick and Leah Haile as Honey.

A sell-out West End revival opened at @sohoplace theatre on September 21 running until December 19, 2026, directed by Marianne Elliott and starring Gillian Anderson and Billy Crudup.

=== Dance interpretation ===
In 1995 and 1996, the Canadian One Yellow Rabbit troupe mounted a homage in dance to Albee, Permission, in the form of an hour-long ballet inspired by Who's Afraid of Virginia Woolf. It was performed in Calgary, Toronto, Phoenix, Guadalajara, and Mexico City.

== Sequels and parodies ==
In 2018 the Elevator Repair Service premiered a sequel written by Kate Scelsa, titled Everyone's Fine with Virginia Woolf. This play introduces new plot elements such as vampirism.

Multiple television shows have episodes parodying the original play. Season 3, Episode 1 of American Dad! features a sub-plot in which the characters of Roger and Francine pretend to be a university professor and his wife. After inviting over a young couple, the two behave much like the characters of George and Martha. The episode concludes with Roger "killing" their imaginary child much like George does in the play.

The critically acclaimed "Dinner Party" episode of The Office (U.S. Season 4, Episode 13) was originally titled "Virginia Woolf" by writers Gene Stupnitsky and Lee Eisenberg. This episode is a parody in which Michael invites new couple Jim and Pam to a dinner party that slowly devolves into a chaotic exhibition of Michael's tense relationship with his girlfriend and former boss, Jan.

Season 2, Episode 4 of Our Flag Means Death is a parody in which the dysfunctional relationship of Anne Bonny and Mary Read is meant to parallel that of George and Martha, and whose antics instigate a reconciliation of Ed and Stede.

Steven Soderbergh’s 2025 film Black Bag, written by David Koepp, is a spy-thriller with an intentional parallel to Who's Afraid of Virginia Woolf. Married couple George and Kathryn, both spies in British intelligence, host a pair of couples, also co-workers and spies, for a dinner party. George investigates all five people during dinner, including his wife, as the source of an intelligence breach.

== Awards ==
Who's Afraid of Virginia Woolf? won both the 1963 Tony Award for Best Play and the 1962–1963 New York Drama Critics' Circle Award for Best Play. Its stars won the 1963 Tony Awards for Best Actor and Actress. It was selected for the 1963 Pulitzer Prize for Drama by that award's drama jury, but the award's advisory board – the trustees of Columbia University – objected to its profanity and sexual themes, and overruled the jury, awarding no Pulitzer Prize for drama in 1963.

The 2005 revival won the 2005 Tony Award for Best Performance by a Leading Actor in a Play for Bill Irwin's role.

The 2012 revival won the 2013 Tony Awards for Best Revival of a Play, Best Performance by an Actor in a Leading Role in a Play (Letts), and Best Direction of a Play (MacKinnon).

== Film ==
A film adaptation of the play was released in 1966. It was directed by Mike Nichols and starred Elizabeth Taylor as Martha, Richard Burton as George, George Segal as Nick, and Sandy Dennis as Honey. All four actors were nominated for Academy Awards: Taylor and Burton for Best Actress and Actor and Dennis and Segal for Supporting Oscars. Taylor won the Oscar for Best Actress but Burton was passed over that year in favor of Paul Scofield in A Man For All Seasons. Dennis won Best Actress in a Supporting Role, while Segal lost to Walter Matthau in The Fortune Cookie.

Jack Valenti identified the film as the first controversial film he had to deal with as president of the Motion Picture Association of America (MPAA). It was the first to use the slang "screw" and the phrase "hump the hostess". As he said,

In company with the MPAA's general counsel, Louis Nizer, I met with Jack Warner, the legendary chieftain of Warner, and his top aide, Ben Kalmenson. We talked for three hours, and the result was deletion of 'screw' and retention of 'hump the hostess', but I was uneasy over the meeting.

=== Original film soundtrack album ===
The film was given a "Deluxe Edition Two-Record Set" soundtrack album release in 1967 by Warner Bros. Records, and was the first film to have its vocals be released in their entirety on an album, as the film at that time could not be shown on network television. It contains the vocals of the four actors performing in the film. The only music on the album is a song, "Virginia Woolf Rock", that plays while Martha and Nick are dancing (but plays a little differently than it does in the film).

In at least two instances alternative takes were used: Taylor's memorable "Goddamn you!" line is restored to "Screw you!", and some of the dialogue from the dancing sequence was lifted from another take. As Martha tells Nick and Honey her story about punching George in the stomach in front of her father, it is heard very clearly while in the film it becomes muffled as the camera follows George into another room to get a gun. The album also runs half an hour shorter than the film, since most pauses and long silences were removed, but virtually every line remains intact. The album's cover has the four main actors and the back cover has some background information about them, the five-month shooting schedule, and Albee, and a brief synopsis of the film.
