= Original Copasetics =

American tap dance team

The Original Copasetics were an ensemble of star tap dancers formed in 1949 on the death of Bill Bojangles Robinson that helped to revive the art of tap. The first group included composer/arranger Billy Strayhorn and the choreographer Cholly Atkins, as well as Honi Coles, Charles “Cookie” Cook and his dance partner Ernest “Brownie” Brown. Other dancers included Chuck Green, Jimmy Slyde, Buster Brown and Howard “Sandman” Sims. The group took its name from Robinson’s familiar observation that “everything is copasetic” and was honored in the 1989 Broadway revue Black and Blue.
