= Tony Waag =

American tap dancer

- Born: Tony Carl Waag; September 8, 1957 (age 67); Fort Collins, Colorado, U.S.
- Occupation: Actor/Tap dancer/Executive Director/Artistic Director
- Spouse: Mark Kellogg

Tony Carl Waag (born September 8, 1957) is a tap dancer, director and producer living in New York City. In 2008, he was dubbed "The Mayor of Tap City" by TheaterMania. He is currently the Executive/Artistic Director of the American Tap Dance Foundation.

== Early life/education ==
Tony Carl Waag was born in Fort Collins, Colorado on September 8, 1957. While growing up, he watched old MGM Hollywood musicals and developed an interest in performing. By high school, he had joined the Storm Mountain Folk Dancers, a local group devoted to the “authentic recreation of regional dance styles, costumes and music.”

After graduating high school in 1976, Waag continued his education across the street at Colorado State University. At first, he majored in Art/Sculpture. During his freshman year, however, he attended a tap workshop led by Brenda Bufalino, Charles “Cookie” Cook and Leslie “Bubba” Gaines. That summer, his network expanded further when he met Charles "Honi" Coles when Honi was on tour with the musical revue, Bubbling Brown Sugar.

A year later, Waag changed his college major to dance and moved to Salt Lake City to continue his studies at the University of Utah.

In 1979, Waag dropped out of college in order to move to San Francisco and study with tap masters Eddie Brown and Tony Wing of Toy & Wing.

== Career ==
After three years of study in San Francisco, Waag moved to New York City (1982) and soon ran into Bufalino. He began studying with her at the now defunct Fazil's Dance Studio in Times Square. While also working as a bartender, Waag performed around the country, eventually forming the American Tap Dance Orchestra (ATDO) with Ms. Bufalino. ATDO was officially incorporated as a not-for-profit 501(c)-3 in 1986, with Waag acting as administrative director.

From 1989 through 1995 Waag's duties at ATDO included managing Woodpeckers Tap Dance Center.

=== Artistic/Executive Director: American Tap Dance Foundation ===
In 2001, ATDO was reorganized to expand its focus with Waag at the helm as both Artistic and executive director. Since then, Waag has created a variety of signature programs under the auspices of the newly named American Tap Dance Foundation (ATDF), including:

- Tap City, the New York City Tap Festival (launched in 2001)
- Rhythm in Motion
- Hoofer & Tap Preservation Awards
- International Tap Dance Hall of Fame (2002)
- The Gregory Hines Youth Scholarship Fund
- The Gregory Hines Collection of American Tap

Waag has continued to perform and choreograph, and has been featured in hundreds of concert, film and television productions internationally. Highlights include:

- Thinking on Their Feet: "Women of the Tap Renaissance" (2010)
- Requiem For a Dream (2000)
- Six Ways to Sunday (1997)
- PBS's Great Performances Tap Dance in America (1989)
- Someone Stole the Baby (1992)

Another career highlight was creating and staging the touring production of "Thank You, Gregory", a tribute to the Legends of Tap Dance (2009), which toured in theaters across the country.

Waag continues to advocate for the importance of tap dance in American Culture. He is a member of the Actors' Equity Association and the Screen Actors Guild.

In 2014, Waag received the Dance Magazine Award.
