= Roxane Butterfly =

French dancer

Roxane Semadeni is a French tap dancer from Toulon, active in the United States. She was nicknamed 'Butterfly' by Jimmy Slyde and performs as Roxane Butterfly. In 2002 she was included in a list of '25 to watch' published by Dance Magazine.

From 1998 she choreographed performances of her all-woman ensemble BeauteeZ´n The Beat.

In 2005 she received funding from Barcelona American fundings to work on her flamenco-tap fusión project Djellaba Groove.

She founded the Jimmy Slyde Institute in Barcelona.
