= Tina Dixon =

American singer, actress and comedian

Tina Dixon, 1946

Tina Dixon (born Augustine Dickson; October 7, 1913 – November 10, 2004) was an American R&B singer, actress and comedian. She became a featured singer in swing bandleader Jimmie Lunceford's band early in her career and recorded for Excelsior, Aladdin, and King Records in the 1940s. By the 1970s, Dixon was making x-rated party records as Auntie Tina Dixon.

== Life and career ==
Dixon was born in New Orleans and moved with her family to Detroit as a child. She began her singing career at the age of 18. Her first gig was at the Club Ballyhoo in Detroit and eventually she performed at the Apollo Theater in Harlem. In 1939, Dixon married tap dancer Leon Collins in Detroit. In 1942, they moved to New York City where Dixon was billed to perform with the Jimmie Lunceford orchestra. Dixon helped land her husband a spot in the show when the opening act called out sick, resulting in a five-year contract for Collins. They with his band at theaters and nightclubs. She appeared at the Tic Toc Club in Boston; Cafe Zanzibar in New York; Club Bali in Washington, D.C.. Dixon was managed by Harold F. Oxley [who also managed Jimmie Lunceford and Mabel Scott]. Dixon also appeared on television, made color movie shorts for Pathe, and performed at army and navy camps.

In June 1945, Dixon recorded "E-Bob-O-Le-Bob" with Jimmie Lunceford for Armed Forces Radio Service (AFRS) Jubilee. AFRS recordings were made by African-American artists to showcase their music to the United States Armed Forces and allied nations; they weren't meant for commercial release. Dixon is credited as the songwriter for the record, but shortly after, singer Helen Humes released the song under the title "Be-Baba-Leba" (Philo 106). Humes is credited as the songwriter on her record which became a hit single although Dixon had been performing it on her act since 1942. Later in 1945, Dixon recorded "E-Bob-O-Le-Bob" with the Flennoy Trio. The copyright controversy was noted in Billboard (January 26, 1946), when Humes' version was hot on the chart:

Charlie Barnet has secured exclusive publishing rights for his Indigo pub outfit to the swing novelty tune.... Barnet closed deal for Be-Baba-Leba with Harold Oxley, the agent, who controlled original copyright of the tune introduced in the first place by Tina Dixon, whom Oxley manages. Dixon also made recording of tune for Excelsior label. Her side, however, came out after the Humes version for Philo. Barnet dickered with Helen Humes on tune for a while until he learned that her recorded version followed Dixon's featuring of the song in night clubs, therefore making Dixon's a prior copyright.

Dixon never achieved chart success, but she continued performing and befriending other entertainers, including comedian Redd Foxx. In 1975, she appeared on his hit television series Sanford & Son. By then she was known as Auntie Tina Dixon and she released two raunchy comedy albums, Take It Out Of This! and Calling All Freaks on Laff Records. Dixon had a role in the 1977 film Big Time.

== Discography ==
=== Singles ===
- 1945: The Flennoy Trio – "E-Bob-O-Le-Bob" (Excelsior 130)
- 1947: Tina Dixon & Lady Blue Allstar – "Don't You Know I Want To Love You" / "Hello Baby" (Aladdin 205)
- 1949: Tina Dixon And Gene Nero Sextet – "Walk That Walk, Daddy-O" / "Parrot Bar Boogie" (King 4257)
- 1950: Tina Dixon And Gene Nero Sextet – "Blow Mr. Be-Bop" (King 4332)

=== Albums ===
- Take It Out Of This! (Laff Records)
- Calling All Freaks (Laff Records)

=== Album appearances ===
- 1985: Those Great Blues Girls From The 40's (Capitol Records)
- 2002: Fine Fine Baby: King's Queens – King's Blues Gals Of The '40s (Westside Records)
