= American Tap Dance Foundation =

Non-profit tap dance company based in New York City

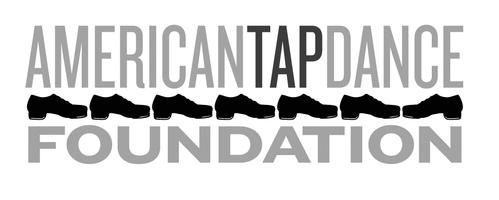
- ATDF Logo
- Formation: 1986
- Type: Not for profit, 501(c) 3 - Dance Organization
- Headquarters: 154 Christopher Street; Suite 2B; New York, NY, 10014
- Location: New York, NY, USA
- Artistic/Executive Director: Tony Waag
- Key people: Founded by Brenda Bufalino, Charles "Honi" Coles and Tony Waag
- Website: www.atdf.org

The American Tap Dance Foundation is a nonprofit organization whose primary goal is the presentation and teaching of tap dance. Its original stated purpose was to provide an "international home for tap dance, perpetuate tap as a contemporary art form, preserve it through performance and an archival library, provide educational programming, and establish a formal school for tap dance."

== History ==
Originally called the American Tap Dance Orchestra (ATDO), the American Tap Dance Foundation was founded in 1986 by tap dancers Brenda Bufalino, Tony Waag, and Charles "Honi" Coles. Bufalino began working with Coles in 1973 when Bufalino produced the documentary, "Great Feats of Feet: Portraits Of the Jazz Tap Dancer" featuring Coles and The Copasetics.

ATDO's first major engagement was on July 4, 1986, at the Statue of Liberty Festival in Battery Park in lower New York City. For the next 15 years, American Tap Dance Orchestra toured the U.S. and Europe. In 1989, ATDO appeared on PBS "Great Performances Tap Dance In America with Gregory Hines".

=== Woodpeckers Tap Dance Center (1989-1995) ===
On November 10, 1989, the ATDO opened Woodpeckers Tap Dance Center at 170 Mercer Street, near Houston Street in New York City. Mr. Coles served as Woodpeckers's chairman; Gregory Hines (who claimed that Woodpeckers was "the world's only tap-only center and had "the finest tap floor I've been on") was a member of the board. Woodpeckers began creating, producing, and presenting various educational programs for adults and children. It also initiated an annual winter tap intensive with master classes, courses and workshops taught by leading International artists and master tap dancers.

A review in The New York Times in 1990 said, "The rough-hewn little theater has the air of both a place where hard and serious work is done and a cozy family living room."

The Center closed in 1995 due to limited funding.

=== 1996 through 2010 ===
==== The Intervening Years ====
ATDO continued to perform and offer classes and workshops, renting classroom and rehearsal studios at various NYC locations and presenting new and classic works around the country and the world. Venues included Lincoln Center's Walter Reade Theater, the Sammy Davis Jr. Festival Plaza in L.A., and Gus Giordano's Jazz Dance Congress 96, (Washington, D.C.'s Kennedy Center) as well as on live television in Rome, Italy, at the Stadttheater Furth Germany, and at the Rio de Janeiro Tap Festival, Brazil.

==== A New Name and Focus ====
Towards the end of 2001, ATDO was renamed the American Tap Dance Foundation (ATDF). The reasons were twofold: first, the new name allowed for a broader focus. The change reflected a new generation of tap dancers and a renewed focus on establishing the first-ever Center for Tap – an international home for dancers, based in New York City. Bufalino stayed on as an artistic mentor and Tony Waag became the Artistic/Executive Director.

The new name also reflected the fact that an organized ensemble no longer existed.

In 2009 the Foundation was awarded an American Masterpiece Grant from the National Endowment for the Arts to reconstruct two ATDO pieces, "Buff Loves Basie Blues," and "Haitian Fight Song,". Both have been subsequently performed by ATDF at various venues around the country including Symphony Space and the Joyce Theater in New York City.

=== A New Home (2010 to the Present) ===
On January 4, 2010, the ATDF relocated to a 3,000 square foot space in Greenwich Village that includes two large dance studios as well as office space.

== Activities ==
The ATDF presents a variety of year-round educational programs, performances, festivals, classes, and public city-wide events.

=== Rhythm in Motion ===
Rhythm in Motion, is an annual showcase for tap choreographers to showcase their work. The showcase includes works by emerging and established tappers and aims to highlight the "rich diversity of contemporary tap dance." In 2015, RIM featured new choreography by MacArthur Fellow, Michelle Dorrance, Brenda Bufalino, Derick K. Grant, Chloe Arnold, and others over a five-day, six-performance program.

=== Tap City ===
The ATDF organizes "Tap City", which has been called, "The preeminent annual tap dance festival of the world.". This annual week-long international event features classes, panels, screenings, and performances. Highlights include awards ceremonies, concert performances, and Tap it Out, a free, public, outdoor event performed in Times Square by a chorus of 300 people "in a pre-choreographed orchestral collage of a cappella unison rhythms, contrapuntal sequences, individual riffs, movements and grooves."

=== Other ===
In 2001, ATDF created the annual Hoofer Award to be presented to prominent tap artists as leaders in the community for their unique contribution to the form and for inspiring future generations. Recipients have included:

- 2001 - Gregory Hines
- 2002 - Jimmy Slyde and Buster Brown
- 2003 - Brenda Bufalino
- 2004 - Dianne Walker, LaVaughn Robinson and Ernest Brown
- 2005 - Sarah Petronio
- 2006 - Lynn Dally
- 2007 - Deborah Mitchell
- 2008 - Derick K. Grant and Tina Pratt
- 2009 - Randy Skinner and Mercedes Ellington
- 2010 - Acia Gray and Dormeshia Sumbry-Edwards
- 2011 - Max Pollak
- 2012 - Jason Samuels Smith
- 2013 - Dean Diggins and Barbara Duffy
- 2014 - Michelle Dorrance
- 2015 - Heather Cornell and Karen Callaway Williams
- 2016 - Ted Levy and Roxanne Butterfly
- 2017 - Ayodele Casel and Sam Weber
- 2018 - Jared Grimes and Katherine Kramer

ATDF also created the Tap Preservation Award in 2001 to honor an outstanding organization or individual for the superior advancement of tap dance through presentation and preservation. It founded the International Tap Dance Hall of Fame in 2002 which includes such notable tap dancers as Bill Robinson, Eleanor Powell, Fred Astaire, the Nicholas Brothers, Jeni Le Gon, Ann Miller, Gregory Hines, and Gene Kelly among many others. ATDF co-created the Gregory Hines Collection of American Tap Dance with the Jerome Robbins Dance Division at the New York Public Library for the Performing Arts.

== Cited Sources ==
1. Valis Hill, Constance (2010). Tap Dancing America: A Cultural History. Oxford University Press. pp. 264–265, 278, 288, 296–297, 358. ISBN 978-0-19-539082-7.
2. Rolnick, Katie (January 21, 2010). "American Tap Dance Foundation Has a New Home". Dance Spirit Magazine.
