= Leon Collins =

American actor

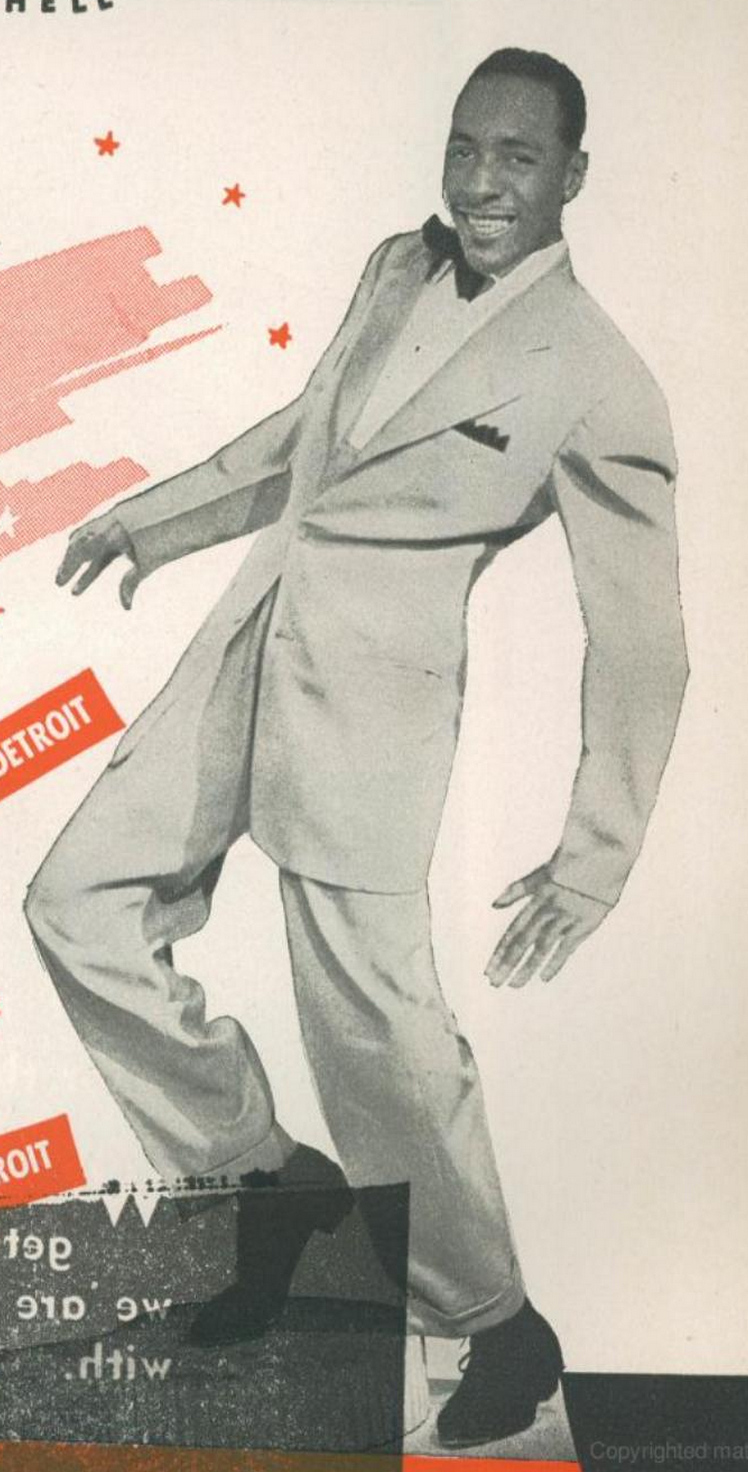
Leon Collins

Leon Collins (February 7, 1922 - April 16, 1985) was an American tap dancer.

Collins was born Leandre Kollins in Chicago, Illinois to a father of West Indian descent. He began tap dancing at an early age, but he wanted to be a prizefighter. As a teenager, Collins performed with worked with Count Basie's orchestra, the bands of Erksine Hawkins, Earl Hines, and Tito Puente. By the age of seventeen, he relocated to Detroit, where he married blues singer Tina Dixon. The couple moved to New York City where Dixon, who was signed to perform with the Jimmie Lunceford Orchestra, recommended that Collins perform with the orchestra when the opening act called out sick. Impressed by his performance, Lunceford signed Collins to a five-year contract.

As work opportunities dried out when rock and roll became popular and big bands became less in demand, he learned to play the guitar, and attended the Berklee School of Music in Boston. By the early 1960s, he was forced to give up dance entirely and during this interim, restored cars for fourteen years until tap dance began to experience a revival. At the urging of people like Tina Pratt and Stanley Brown, he came out of retirement and began to teach. In 1976, he performed with other retired dancers in a tap revival show at Boston's New England Life Hall, which led to new opportunities. He opened a studio with Boston's First Lady of Jazz, Mae Arnette. The studio, Star Steps Studio, was located in the Roxbury neighborhood of Boston.

In 1982, the studio moved to Brookline and a new partnership was formed. Leon and three of his students, Clara Brosnaham "CB" Hetherington, Dianne Walker and Pamela Raff opened the Leon Collins Dance Studio Inc. During this time, Leon formed a company with his students and Joan Hill (pianist). Leon Collins & Co. performed mainly in the New England area from 1982 until his untimely death in 1985. He had a few bit parts in the movies and is known for his exceptional tap dancing and teaching. He was best known for his work with jazz and bebop and in his latter years his work with classical music, in particular, his rendition of "Flight of the Bumblebee".

A documentary produced by David Wadsworth, Songs Unwritten, was filmed about Collins and released shortly after his death. He died of lung cancer in Boston in 1985.

Collins was inducted into the Tap Dance Hall of Fame in 2007.
