= Savion Glover =

American dancer, actor, and choreographer (born 1973)

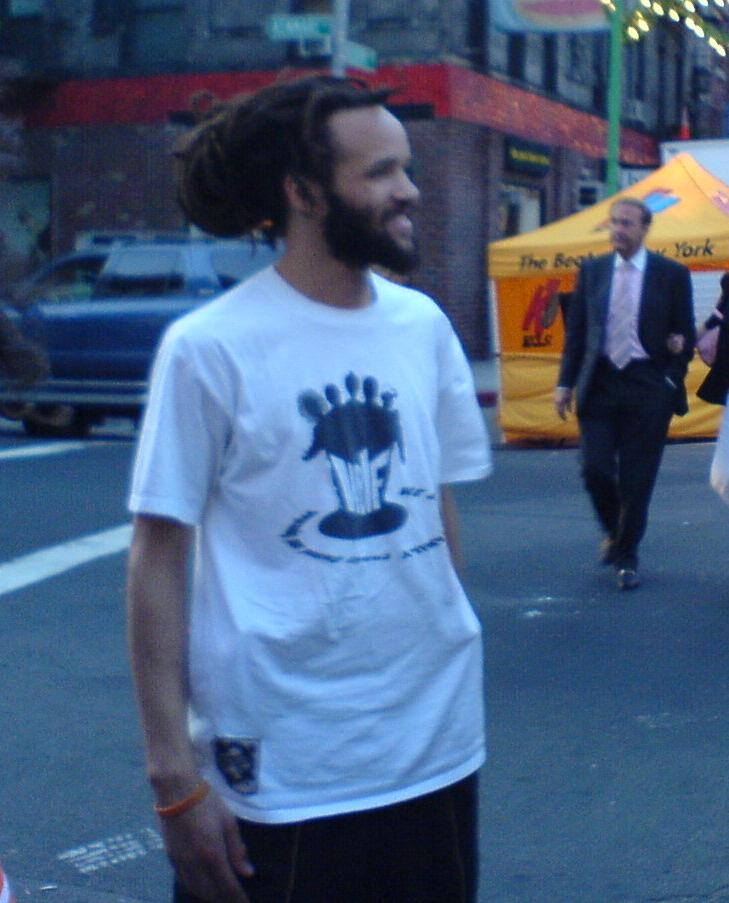
- Glover in 2007
- Born: November 19, 1973 (age 52); Newark, New Jersey, U.S.
- Occupations: Dancer; actor; choreographer
- Years active: 1985–present
- Website: saviongloverproductions.com

Savion Glover (born November 19, 1973) is an American tap dancer, actor and choreographer.

== Early life ==
The youngest of three sons, Glover was born to a white father, who left the family before he was born, and a black mother. Glover's great-grandfather on his mother's side, Dick Lundy, was a shortstop in the Negro leagues. He managed eleven Negro League baseball teams, including the Newark Eagles. His grandfather, Bill Lewis, was a big band pianist and vocalist. His grandmother, Anna Lundy Lewis, was the minister of music at New Hope Baptist Church in Newark, New Jersey. She played for Whitney Houston when she was singing in the gospel choir, and was the one who first noticed Savion's musical talent. She once held him and hummed some rhythms to him, and he smiled and joined along. Glover graduated from Newark Arts High School in 1991.

== Career ==
Glover stated that his style is "young and funk." When asked to describe what funk is, he says it is the bass line. "Funk is anything that gets one's head on beat. It is riding with the rhythm. It is a pulse that keeps one rolling with the beat." Gregory Hines, a tap legend, was one of Glover's tap teachers. Hines stated that "Savion is possibly the best tap dancer that ever lived." Glover liked to start his pieces with some old school moves from famous tappers and then work his way into his own style. Hines said it is like paying homage to those he respects. When Honi Coles died, Savion performed at his memorial service. He finished his dance with a famous Coles move: a backflip into a split from standing position, then getting up without using one's hands. Glover rarely does this move because it wasn't his style, but he did it because it was Coles' style that he wanted to keep alive. "I feel like it's one of my responsibilities to keep the style." Henry LeTang called Glover "the Sponge" because he learned very quickly with everything thrown at him. LeTang taught the Hines brothers back in the 1950s and taught Glover for a little while before having him work for "Black and Blue," a tap revue in Paris in 1987. Many legendary tappers taught Glover such as LeTang, the Hines brothers, Jimmy Slyde, Dianne Walker, Chuck Green, Lon Chaney (Isaiah Chaneyfield), Honi Coles, Sammy Davis Jr., Buster Brown, Howard Sims, Arthur Duncan, and Leonard Reed

=== Teaching ===
He has been teaching tap since he was 14 years old. Glover created Real Tap Skills, and started HooFeRz Club School for Tap in Newark, New Jersey. At age seven, Glover drummed in a group called Three Plus One. In the group, he demanded that he dance while he played the drum. Glover has a heavy foot for tap. He dances hard and loud in every step, and teaches his students how to "hit," a term related to one's ability to express oneself, complete a tap sequence, or say something.

=== Choreography ===
==== Notable choreographed pieces ====
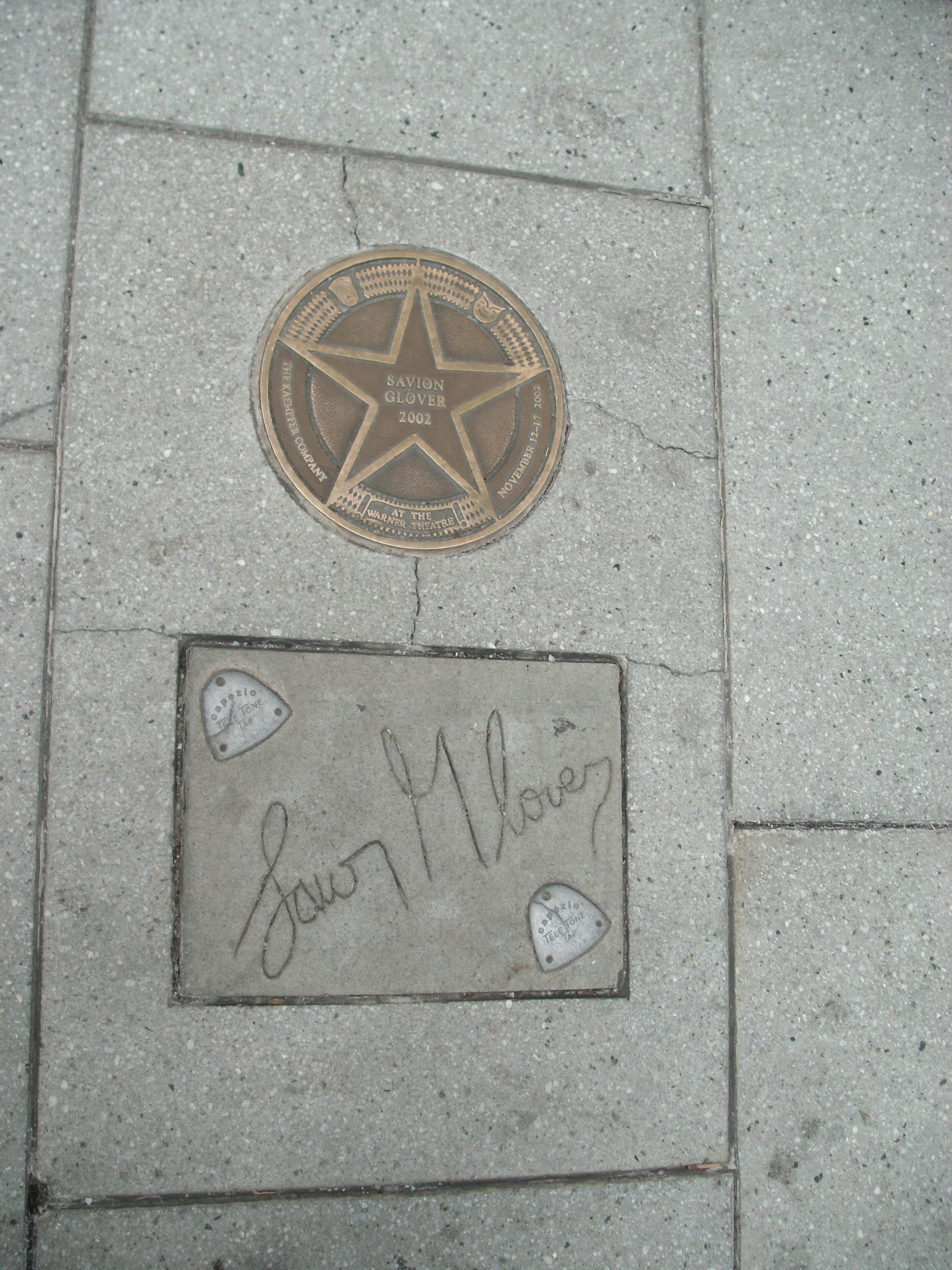
Glover's signature, with shoe taps, in front of the Warner Theatre in Washington, D.C.

- Bring in 'Da Noise, Bring in 'Da Funk
- Savion Glover's Nu York, ABC special
- ABC opening to Monday Night Football
- The Rat Pack, HBO movie
- Created a dance company called NYOTs (Not Your Ordinary Tappers)
- PBS for President Clinton in Savion Glover's Stomp, Slide, and Swing: In Performances in the Whitehouse
- Savion Glover/Downtown: Live Communication
- Shuffle Along, or, the Making of the Musical Sensation of 1921 and All That Followed

When Glover choreographs a piece, he improvises as he generates a dance sequence. As he finds rhythms, he listens for new sounds at many points on the stage. "I'm feelin' the stage for sounds. You might find a spot on it that gives you that bass; you might find a spot on the floor that gives you that dead type tom-tom sound." "I think what makes Savion an incredible artist is his extraordinary joy in what he does. He is able to live in that state of joy and not compromise his emotional complexity like the earlier tap dancers had to," says George C. Wolfe.

One of the timesteps performed in Barbra Streisand's Timeless in Glover's performance as "Brother Time" has been informally named the "Savion Glover Timestep" by many tap dancers.

=== The Tap Dance Kid (1985) ===
This musical was based on the 1974 novel Nobody's Family is Going to Change by Louise Fitzhugh. Glover's Broadway debut, at the age of 11, was as a replacement with this show. The musical was choreographed by Danny Daniels, with direction by Vivian Matalon; the music was by Henry Krieger and lyrics by Robert Lorick. Reviews of this show were mediocre. The New York Times claimed it was a traditional story to give children a dream to look forward to, but was not anything exceptional. However, the musical went on to be nominated for seven Tony Awards, including Best Musical.

=== Black and Blue (1989) ===
Performed at the age of 15. For this performance, he became one of the youngest performers ever nominated for a Tony Award.

=== Jelly's Last Jam (1992) ===
In Jelly's Last Jam (1992), the tap dancing was choreographed by Ted Levy and Gregory Hines, who starred as Jelly Roll Morton. Glover played the role of "Young Jelly", and was nominated for the Drama Desk Award as Outstanding Featured Actor in a Musical.

=== Bring in 'Da Noise, Bring in 'Da Funk (1996) ===
Glover performed in this musical and also choreographed it. He was nominated for the Tony Award, Actor in a Musical for his roles as Lil' Dahlin' and 'da Beat and for Choreography. "Mr. Glover meticulously and respectfully demonstrates the techniques made famous by each, then blends them all into an exultant stylistic brew that belongs to no one but him. As dance, as musical, as theater, as art, as history and entertainment, there's nothing Noise/Funk cannot and should not do." -The New York Times.

=== Shuffle Along, or, the Making of the Musical Sensation of 1921 and All That Followed (2016) ===
Glover choreographed the musical Shuffle Along, or, the Making of the Musical Sensation of 1921 and All That Followed, which opened in 2016 at the Music Box Theatre. He was nominated for a Tony Award for Best Choreography and a Drama Desk Award for his work on the musical.

== Filmography ==
=== Film ===
- 1988 - Driving Me Crazy, Audition artist, First Run
- 1989 - Tap, as Louis, TriStar
- 2000 - Bamboozled, as Manray/Mantan, New Line
- 2001 - The Making of Bamboozled
- 2000 - Barbra Streisand's "Timeless"
- 2006 - Happy Feet, choreography and motion capture for "Mumble"
- 2011 - Happy Feet 2, choreography for "Mumble"

=== Television ===
- Shangri-La Plaza, 1990 CBS pilot
- Sesame Street (1990–95)
- Dance in America: Tap!
- Black Film Makers Hall of Fame
- The Kennedy Center Honors
- Academy Awards Ceremony (1996) for Tom Hanks tribute
- The Wall, as Bracey Mitchell, 1998 Showtime TV movie
- The Rat Pack, as the choreographer, 1998 HBO TV movie
- Bojangles, as Newcomer, 2001 Showtime TV movie
- So You Think You Can Dance: The Next Generation (2016) - Choreographer
- The Talk (2018) - Routine with co-host Sheryl Underwood as part of the show's New Year's Evolution

==== Episodic ====
- 1987 - Super Dave
- 1998 - Sin City Spectacular (also known as Penn & Teller's Sin City Spectacular), FX
- 1999 - The Jamie Foxx Show, "Taps for Royal," The WB
- 1999 - Saturday Night Live, (Uncredited), NBC
- 2000 - Odyssey, America!
- 2003 - Cedric the Entertainer Presents, Bartholomew, Fox

==== TV specials ====
- 1989 - Tap Dance in America (also known as Gregory Hines' Tap Dance in America), PBS
- 1991 - The Kennedy Center Honors: A Celebration of the Performing Arts, CBS
- 1992 - Macy's Thanksgiving Day Parade, NBC
- 1992 - Jammin': Jelly Roll Morton on Broadway (documentary), PBS
- 1993 - Sesame Street Stays Up Late! (also known as Sesame Street Stays Up Late! A Monster New Year's Eve Party), as Savion, PBS
- 1994 - Sesame Street's All-Star 25th Birthday: Stars and Street Forever!, ABC
- 1994 - In a New Light `94, ABC
- 1995 - The Kennedy Center Honors: A Celebration of the Performing Arts, CBS
- 1996 - Vanessa Williams & Friends: Christmas in New York, ABC
- 1997 - It Just Takes One, USA
- 1997 - 53rd Presidential Inaugural Gala, CBS
- 1998 - Slide and Swing with Savion Glover, Stomp, PBS
- 1998 - Savion Glover's Nu York, as the Host, ABC
- 1998 - Savion Glover's Nu York, Executive producer and choreographer, ABC
- 1998 - The First 50 Years, Quincy Jones, ABC
- 1998 - The New Jersey Performing Arts Center Opening Night Gala, PBS,
- 1999 - Disney's Young Musicians Symphony Orchestra in Concert, Disney Channel
- 1999- The Jamie Foxx Show
- 2000 - The Steadfast Tin Soldier: An Animated Special from the "Happily Ever After: Fairy Tales for Every Child" Series (animated), the voice of toy dancer, HBO
- 2001 - Barbra Streisand-Timeless, Brother Time, Fox
- 2001 - Barbra Streisand-Timeless, as the choreographer, Fox
- 2002 - Olympic Winter Games, Closing ceremony, NBC
- 2002 - AFI Life Achievement Award: A Tribute to Tom Hanks, USA

=== Awards presentations ===
- 1989 - The 61st Annual Academy Awards Presentation, ABC
- 1989 - 16th Annual Black Filmmakers Hall of Fame, syndicated
- 1996 - The 68th Annual Academy Awards Presentation, ABC
- 1997 - Launching the Tonys, as the Presenter, Broadway `97, PBS
- 1997 - The 51st Annual Tony Awards, CBS
- 1997 - 39th Grammy Awards, CBS
- 1998 - The 13th Annual Stellar Gospel Music Awards, syndicated
- 1998 - 12th Annual Soul Train Music Awards, syndicated
- 1999 - 30th NAACP Image Awards, Fox
- 2001 - The 32nd NAACP Image Awards, Fox

=== Music videos ===
2001 - "Timeless: Live in Concert", Brother Time

- Also appeared in the music video "Attack Me with Your Love" by Cameo (1985)
- Also appeared in the music video "Havana" by Kenny G
- Also appeared in the music video "It's All About the Benjamins" by Puff Daddy and the Family

== Stage appearances ==
- 1984 - The Tap Dance Kid, (Broadway debut) Title character
- 1989–91- Black and Blue, Minskoff Theatre, Broadway
- 1992–93 - Jelly's Last Jam, as Young Jelly, Virginia Theatre, Broadway
- 1996–97 - Bring in da Noise, Bring in da Funk, Ambassador Theatre, Broadway
- 1998 - Savion Glover: Downtown, Variety Arts Theatre, New York City
- 1999 - Keep Bangin′, Players Theatre, New York City
- 2001 - Foot Notes, Wilshire Theatre, Los Angeles
- 2002 - Savion Glover with TiDii the Egg, Empire State Plaza, Albany, NY

=== Tours ===
- Foot Notes, The Concert, U. S. cities
- 2002 - Bring in da Noise, Bring in da Funk, U.S. cities/international cities
- Also toured U.S. cities in Jelly's Last Jam
- 2013 - Stepz, U.S. cities/London

== Albums ==
- 1989 - Black and Blue (original cast recording), DRG
- 1992 - Jelly's Last Jam (original cast recording), Mercury/PolyGram
- 1995 - Hot Jazz for a Cool Yule, Pacific Vista Productions
- 1996 - Bring in da Noise, Bring in da Funk (original cast recording), RCA Victor
- 1996 - Prince: "Joint 2 Joint" (tap dance breakdown), from the album Emancipation, NPG/EMI
- 1997 - Abbey Lincoln: "Who Used to Dance", from the album Who Used to Dance, Verve
- 2002 - Talib Kweli: "Stand 2 the Side", from the album Quality, Rawkus/MCA/Universal

== Publications ==
=== Books ===
- 1997 - Contemporary Black Biography, Volume 14, Gale
- 1997 - Newsmakers, Issue 4, Gale
- 2000 - Savion! My Life in Tap, with Bruce Weber, HarperCollins

=== Periodicals ===
- November 1994 Dance Magazine
- April 1996 Dance Magazine
- May 23, 1998 TV Guide, p. 6

== Awards ==
- 1996 - Tony Award for Best Choreography for Bring in 'Da Noise, Bring in 'Da Funk
- 1992 - Dance Magazine Award for choreography, making him the youngest recipient in N.E.A. history.

== See also ==
- List of dancers

== Sources ==
- Brantley, Ben, "THEATER REVIEW;Story of Tap as the Story of Blacks", Rev. of Broadway. The New York Times, November 16, 1995. Retrieved February 13, 2011.
- Filmbug. "Savion Glover". Filmbug Movie Stars. New Line Cinema, January 1, 2000. Retrieved February 13, 2011.
- Hill, Constance Valis, "Tap Dancing America". Oxford University Press. Retrieved February 10, 2011.
- Kisselgoff, Anna. "DANCE VIEW; Elegant Ghosts Haunt 'Black and Blue'", New York Times, May 21, 1989. Retrieved February 14, 2011.
- Lahr, John. Light Fantastic: Adventures in Theatre. New York: Dial, 1996. Print.
- "Savion Glover Biography (1973-)". Film Reference. NetIndustries, LLC. January 1, 2010. Retrieved February 14, 2011.
- Rich, Frank. "STAGE: A BOY AND HIS DREAMS IN 'TAP DANCE KID'", Rev. of Broadway. The New York Times, December 22, 1983. Retrieved February 12, 2011.
