= Tap (film) =

1989 American dance drama film by Nick Castle

- Theatrical release poster
- Directed by: Nick Castle
- Written by: Nick Castle
- Produced by: Gary Adelson; Fran Saperstein; Richard Vane
- Starring: Gregory Hines; Suzzanne Douglas; Joe Morton; Sammy Davis Jr.
- Cinematography: David Gribble
- Edited by: Patrick Kennedy
- Music by: James Newton Howard
- Distributed by: Tri-Star Pictures
- Release date: February 10, 1989
- Running time: 111 minutes
- Country: United States
- Language: English
- Box office: $9.1 million

Tap is a 1989 American dance drama film written and directed by Nick Castle and starring Gregory Hines and Sammy Davis Jr.

== Plot ==
Max Washington, just released from prison after serving time for burglary, is a talented tap dancer. His late father owned a dance studio that is now run by Little Mo, whose daughter Amy Simms gives lessons to children.

Back on the streets, Max isn't interested in dancing again but he is interested in seeing Amy, his former girlfriend. A local gangster, Nicky, doesn't care for Max personally but does try to recruit him to take part in a robbery.

Amy has a job as dancer in an upcoming Broadway show and tells its choreographer about Max, hoping to land him a role in the chorus. Max is reluctant to agree to it, then incensed when he is humiliated during the auditions. Max must decide whether to swallow his pride and dance the way the man wants, or give up his art once and for all and return to a life of crime.

== Cast ==
- Gregory Hines as Max Washington
- Sammy Davis Jr. as Little Mo Simms
- Suzzanne Douglas as Amy Simms
- Joe Morton as Nicky
- Savion Glover as Louis Simms
- Terrence E. McNally as Bob Wythe

== Production ==
Tap was the final feature film appearance of Sammy Davis Jr. (he would co-star in the 1990 TV movie The Kid Who Loved Christmas, which aired after his death).

The cast also included Suzzanne Douglas, Savion Glover, Joe Morton, and Terrence E. McNally. The original score was composed by James Newton Howard and the dance routines performed in Washington's old hangout, a club patronized by "hoofers", were choreographed by Henry LeTang. Also included are cameos, particularly during a challenge sequence, by veteran dancers Arthur Duncan, Buster Brown, Bunny Briggs, Howard Sims, Steve Condos, Harold Nicholas, and Jimmy Slyde.

== Reception ==
In the Chicago Sun-Times, film critic Roger Ebert gave the film 3 out of 4 stars, writing:

Imagine how Bruce Springsteen would feel if rock 'n' roll lost its popularity overnight and you'd know, I guess, how the great tap dancers felt in the early 1950s. One day, tap dancing was enormously popular... The next day, it was passe—blown away by rock. And there was another cruel blow for many of the tap stars, who were black: As the Civil Rights Movement gained strength, tap dancing itself was seen as projecting the wrong image of black people... [Parts] of this plot seem recycled out of old musicals, all right, but the spirit of the film is fresh and the characters are convincing. Hines has been dancing professionally since he was a juvenile in the 1950s, but he's better known as an actor, and here he has a role that challenges him on both levels. He has a way of being strong and being subtle about it. Davis has never had a juicier role in a movie, and for once he isn't playing himself; he's playing the opposite of glitter and glitz, and his sincerity is believable.

== See also ==
- List of American films of 1989
