= Black and Blue (musical) =

Musical

- Music: W. C. Handy; Louis Armstrong; Duke Ellington; Fats Waller; Eubie Blake; Big Maybelle
- Lyrics: Various
- Productions: 1985 Paris; 1989 Broadway; European Tours; 1993 PBS Television

Black and Blue is a musical revue celebrating the black culture of dance and music in Paris between World War I and World War II.

Based on an idea by Mel Howard and conceived by Hector Orezzoli and Claudio Segovia, it consists of songs by artists such as W. C. Handy, Louis Armstrong, Duke Ellington, Fats Waller, Eubie Blake, and Big Maybelle and skits peppered with bits of bawdy humor.

== Productions ==
The revue was first presented at the Chatelet Theatre in Paris in 1985. The revue included Sandra Reaves-Phillips. The Broadway production opened on January 26, 1989, at the Minskoff Theatre and closed on January 20, 1991, after 829 performances and 32 previews. Directed by Orezzoli and Segovia and choreographed by Henry LeTang, Cholly Atkins, Frankie Manning, and Fayard Nicholas the cast of forty-one singers, dancers, and musicians included Ruth Brown, Linda Hopkins, Carrie Smith, Savion Glover, Claude Williams, Roland Hanna, Grady Tate, Jimmy Slyde, Bill Easley, Buster Brown (tap dancer), Jimmy "Preacher" Robbins, Lon Chaney (the jazz tap dancer, not the actor) and Bunny Briggs. Dianne Walker was the show's curator and sustainer of the choreography and stage direction, as well as a featured dancer. In 1990, LaVern Baker made her Broadway debut, replacing Ruth Brown for the last eight months of the run.

The score included "St. Louis Blues," "I Can't Give You Anything But Love," "In a Sentimental Mood," "Am I Blue?," "Stompin' at the Savoy," and the title tune.

The original cast recording won a Grammy Award.

Following the Broadway engagement, Mel Howard took Black and Blue on two Europe tours, performing at such venues as The Chatelet Theater in Paris, The Thalia in Hamburg, Theater des Westens in Berlin, The Deutsches Theater in Munich, and The Carre Theater in Amsterdam.

A television production directed by Robert Altman aired on PBS' Great Performances in 1993. The Variety reviewer wrote:"'Black and Blue' never looked as good on Broadway as it does in Robert Altman's keenly observed, briskly paced small-screen version of the rhythm and blues revue. This is a slightly reduced edition of Altman's February 1991 taping at the Minskoff Theater, sold as a pay-per-view in Japan."

== Awards and nominations ==
=== Original Broadway production ===
Year	Award	Category	Nominee	Result
1989	Tony Award	Best Musical		Nominated
1989	Tony Award	Best Performance by a Leading Actress in a Musical	Ruth Brown	Won
1989	Tony Award	Best Performance by a Leading Actress in a Musical	Linda Hopkins	Nominated
1989	Tony Award	Best Performance by a Featured Actor in a Musical	Bunny Briggs	Nominated
1989	Tony Award	Best Performance by a Featured Actor in a Musical	Savion Glover	Nominated
1989	Tony Award	Best Direction of a Musical	Claudio Segovia and Héctor Orezzoli	Nominated
1989	Tony Award	Best Scenic Design	Claudio Segovia and Héctor Orezzoli	Nominated
1989	Tony Award	Best Costume Design	Claudio Segovia and Héctor Orezzoli	Won
1989	Tony Award	Best Choreography	Cholly Atkins, Henry LeTang, Frankie Manning and Fayard Nicholas	Won
1989	Tony Award	Best Lighting Design	Neil Peter Jampolis and Jane Reisman	Nominated
1989	Drama Desk Award	Outstanding Musical		Nominated
1989	Drama Desk Award	Outstanding Lighting Design	Neil Peter Jampolis and Jane Reisman	Nominated
