= Eddie Brown (dancer) =

American dancer

Eddie Brown (1918–1992) was an American tap dancer.

== Origin ==
When Eddie Brown was 16, he entered a talent contest in his hometown. He won first place and was discovered by famous American entertainer Bill “Bojangles” Robinson, who offered him a job in New York. Brown's parents would not allow him to travel across the country to dance because he was still in school; however, Brown went to New York anyway. Since Brown was still underage, he lived on the money he made from dancing on the streets until he turned 18, when he joined Robinson's show at the Apollo Theater in Harlem.

== Career ==
Throughout the 1930s and 1940s, Brown danced professionally as part of a trio with Carl Gibson and Jerry Reed, and also as a solo dancer in nightclubs. He performed with swing and jazz musicians such as Jimmie Lunceford, Duke Ellington, and Dizzy Gillespie. he also danced with Bill “Bojangles” Robinson, and toured with The Bill Robinson Revue for six years. The show traveled from New York to the West Coast, but fell apart when Robinson suggested taking the group to Richmond, VA. The other dancers quit the tour, anxious about performing in the South due to concerns for their careers and safety.

After his death, the American Tap Dance Foundation inducted him to the International Tap Dance Hall of Fame in 2007.

== Style ==
Brown was renowned for his distinctive style of tap dancing, often referred to as 'scientific tap.' During the era when he honed his craft, swing music dominated the dance scene in Omaha. Brown's deep understanding of rhythm became a fundamental aspect of his performances. After his tenure with Robinson, he emerged as a soloist and further developed his signature style, which was characterized by complex, syncopated steps and patterns. He coined the term 'scientific rhythm' for the tap dancing technique he both performed and taught. Brown described his method, stating, 'You heard all this music and rhythm but could not see where it was coming from.' He emphasized the importance of aural skills in mastering tap dancing, asserting, 'A good ear ain't good or bad, but a good ear is what you need. That’s why tap is scientific
