= Cholly Atkins =

American dancer and vaudeville performer

- Born: Charles Sylvan Atkinson; September 13, 1913; Pratt City, Alabama, U.S.
- Died: April 19, 2003 (aged 89); Las Vegas, Nevada, U.S.
- Other name: "The Man with the Moves"
- Occupations: Choreographer, dancer
- Spouses: Catherine Williams (m. 1936; div. 1944) Dottie Saulters (m. 1944; died 1962) Maye Harrison (before 2003)
- Awards: 1989: Tony: Best Choreography; Black and Blue

Charles "Cholly" Atkins (born Charles Sylvan Atkinson; September 13, 1913 – April 19, 2003) was an American dancer and vaudeville performer, who later became noted as the house choreographer for the various artists on the label Motown.

== Biography ==
Born in Pratt City, Alabama, Cholly began dancing in the late 1930s before his military service in 1942 during World War II. Upon leaving the U.S. Army, he first found fame as one-half of Atkins & Coles, a top vaudeville dance act with partner Charles "Honi" Coles, debuting at the Apollo Theater in Harlem, New York. Atkins and Coles toured extensively nationally and internationally, performing in showcases with major jazz and swing bands, including those led by Louis Armstrong, Charlie Barnet, Count Basie, Cab Calloway, and Lionel Hampton. The pair also performed from 1949 to 1952 on Broadway in the stage 4 production, Gentlemen Prefer Blondes.

In the mid-1950s, Cholly began teaching dance steps to the Cadillacs, Shirelles, Moonglows, Frankie Lymon & the Teenagers, Little Anthony & The Imperials, and other vocal groups. His dance steps were a new style coined "vocal choreography", as singers enhanced their vocal performances with stylish combinations of gestures and steps. After working as a freelance choreographer in 1962 for The Miracles, Atkins was hired by Berry Gordy to work as a Motown choreographer in 1964, and set about developing the routines that would later become the trademark moves of other Motown acts like The Supremes, The Temptations (Atkins was also featured in the video for their hit single "Lady Soul"), The Four Tops, The Marvelettes, Gladys Knight & the Pips and others. Atkins would, in fact, continue working with Motown artists well into the 1980s. He choreographed for non-Motown artists as well, namely the dance routines of The Cadillacs in the 1950s, and the Sylvers, as well as The O'Jays during the mid-1970s, appearing with them on an episode of Soul Train. He also worked with Detroit rock band DC Drive and is featured in the "You Need Love" video.

In 1989, Atkins received a Tony Award for choreographing the Broadway show Black and Blue. He also accepted a 1993 National Endowment for the Arts three-year fellowship to tour colleges and universities teaching vocal choreography. He continued to teach dance in Las Vegas until February 2003.

== Death ==
Diagnosed with pancreatic cancer in March 2003, Atkins died of the cancer several weeks later on April 19, 2003, in Las Vegas, Nevada. He was 89.

== Family ==
Marriages

- Atkins married Catherine Gayle Williams (maiden; born 1914) November 27, 1936, in Los Angeles. They were divorced in 1944. She had been a dancer at the chorus line of Cotton Club productions. After leaving show business in 1942, Williams went on to earn a master's degree in Social Work from the University of Iowa and has had a distinguished career in Iowa in social work.

1932: Valedictorian, North High School, Des Moines
1980: Williams was inducted into the Iowa Women's Hall of Fame
November 21, 2014: Williams was honored by the Iowa House of Representatives for her life's work and in celebration of her 100th birthday

- Atkins married Dorothy ("Dottie") Lee Saulters (maiden; 1922–1962) September 2, 1944, in Wilmington, Delaware, while he was in the U.S. Army. Dottie, who had become his dance partner in 1942, had been married to Honi Coles from 1936 to 1944; Coles had been a longtime dance partner in shows with Atkins, and continued to perform with Atkins
- Atkins married Maye Ollie Harrison (1918–2004) and remained married to her until his death.
