= Jimmy Slyde =

American tap dancer (1927–2008)

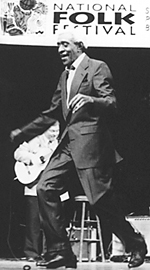
- James "Jimmy Slyde" Godbolt receives an award for tap-dancing from the NEA, 2006
- Born: James Titus Godbolt; October 2, 1927; Atlanta, Georgia, U.S.
- Died: May 16, 2008 (aged 80); Hanson, Massachusetts, U.S.
- Occupation: Tap dancer
- Years active: 1948–2008

James Titus Godbolt (October 2, 1927 – May 16, 2008), known professionally as Jimmy Slyde and also as the "King of Slides", was an American tap dancer known for his innovative tap style mixed with jazz.

Slyde was a popular rhythm tap dancer in America in the mid-20th century, when he performed on the nightclub and burlesque circuits. He was also popular in Europe and lived in Paris for a brief period of his life. Slyde appeared in several musicals and shows in the 1980s, and he received numerous awards for his talent. He was known for his signature move, the slide.

== Early life ==
Godbolt was born in Atlanta and moved to Boston at the age of three. As a child, his mother encouraged him to play the violin, and he enrolled at the Boston Conservatory of Music to advance as a violinist. However, the Conservatory was across the street from Stanley Brown's dance studio, which he would visit to watch great tap dancers such as Bill "Bojangles" Robinson, John W. Bubbles, Charles "Honi" Coles, and Derby Wilson. At the age of twelve, Godbolt quit violin lessons at the Conservatory and began tap lessons at Brown's studio with his mother's blessing (she wanted him to do something other than play sports to help contain his energy). At the studio, he studied under Brown himself and a student teacher, Eddie "Schoolboy" Ford, who taught Godbolt the slide. Godbolt connected with another dancer known for slides, Jimmy "Sir Slyde" Mitchell, and they put together an act to take on the road.

== Career ==
In the 1940s, Mitchell and Godbolt started performing at local clubs and on the burlesque circuit calling themselves the Slyde Brothers. This in turn caused Godbolt to be renamed forevermore, Jimmy "Slyde". Their acts included action tricks similar to those the Nicholas Brothers performed; however, they used slides as their trademark move. One dance critic, Sally Sommer, explained his slides as such, "He's upstage left and sliding downstage right as fast and smooth as a skier, arms held out to the side, head tilted. He stops the cascade by banking backward, slips into a fast flurry of taps, working quick and low to the floor and ends the phrase by pulling up high and flashing off a triple turn." The act was such a hit, they received invitations to go on the road to perform with big band names of the time, including Count Basie, Duke Ellington, Louis Armstrong, and Barry Harris. Their tapping was part of the bands' songs where they would create the music for many measures and then the band would come back in, and they would trade off back and forth like that the entire act.

Slyde performed during the 1950s, at a time when rock and roll was emerging and diverting American interest away from big band music with tap acts. He attempted to find work in other cities including San Francisco, Chicago, and Hollywood on the burlesque and nightclub circuits as well as in movies, but work had dried up in America. He found a temporary job working as a choreographer for the tap dancers the Crosby Brothers in the 1960s, but in 1966 Slyde was invited to perform at the Berlin Jazz Festival in Europe. He attended with Baby Laurence, James Buster Brown, and Chuck Green, and the crowd received them with positive praise including regarding them as "Harlem's All-Star Dancers". He moved to Paris in the 1970s, where he worked intensively with Sarah Petronio. Petronio nurtured the expatriated Slyde out from self-imposed retirement in France, back into a productive and creative fulfillment and became his dancing partner in Tap and Jazz concerts "It's About Time", accompanied by some of the Europe's finest jazz musicians.

After living, teaching, and performing in Paris, he appeared in the production Black and Blue (1985), which was later reset in New York on Broadway in 1989, in which he also performed. As part of the Broadway cast, he was nominated for a Tony Award for this performance, and appeared on the original cast recording album, soloing on the song "Stompin' at the Savoy". He was part of the 1980s tap revival, which led him to stay in the United States and thrive much like during his early career. Throughout his revival and the resurgence of tap in America, Slyde performed in the films The Cotton Club (1984), Round Midnight (1986), and Tap (1989), with Gregory Hines and Sammy Davis Jr. He also appeared on several television shows and in the 1985 television special Motown Returns to the Apollo, which won the 1985 Emmy Award for Outstanding Variety, Music or Comedy Program. In 1992, Slyde was a featured artist in "The Majesty of Tap" dance concert at the Lincoln Center in New York.

In the 1990s, Slyde started holding jam sessions every week at a jazz nightclub in New York called La Cave. This became an education-based practice where up-and-coming tappers would come and improvise, while older and experienced tappers would mentor them. Among the mentored included dancers such as Savion Glover, Van Porter, Ira Bernstein, and Roxane Butterfly.

== Legacy and death ==
Slyde was known for being a great rhythm tapper who had impeccable musicality (partly due to his early music training), perfect timing, and slides that made it appear is if he could glide across the floor effortlessly. His slides were essential to his musicality. "The slides took on many parts of speech, from little connective scoots to long, stage-traversing slalom runs. Slides allowed him to tease the beat, delaying then catching up. They were silences, visually exciting rests, but they also functioned as long notes, as Slyde's physical dynamics, speeding and slowing, suggested crescendos and diminuendos." He was usually the last dancer to perform because he would top any dancer who rivaled him. However, Slyde was a humble man happy to be part of the tap community, who brought a sound-oriented emphasis to tap and called it "a translating thing". The younger generation gained knowledge from him and regarded him as one of the greats including Savion Glover who stated he was "the Godfather of tap" and "one of the true masters of the art form".

Slyde died on May 16, 2008, at the age of 80 in his home in Hanson, Massachusetts.

== Filmography ==
Feature films and documentaries
Year	Title	Role	Notes
1984	The Cotton Club	Hoofer	(credited as Jimmy Slide)
1985	About Tap	self	short documentary film
1986	Round Midnight	dancer	
1989	Tap	Slim	
2005	The Human Hambone	self	documentary

Television
Year	Title	Role	Notes
1959	The Billy Daniels Show	self	episode dated January 13, 1959
1969	The Tonight Show Starring Johnny Carson	self	episode dated September 17, 1969
1985	Motown Returns to the Apollo	self	Television special, aired May 19, 1985; Emmy winner
1987	The Kennedy Center Honors: A Celebration of the Performing Arts	self	episode aired December 30, 1987
1989	"Tap Dance in America"	self	Great Performances PBS series; episode aired 1989; Emmy winner
1990	Eureeka's Castle	self	Nickelodeon series; episode Fun, Fun Fun! (w/ Deana Martin), aired 1990;
1993	"Black and Blue"	dancer	Great Performances PBS series; season 21, episode 1, aired February 17, 1993
1998	In Performance at the White House	self	Television special; aired September 16, 1998

== Awards and honors ==
- 1984–1986: Choreographer's Fellowship, National Endowment for the Arts
- 1988: Choreographer's Fellowship, National Endowment for the Arts
- 1993: Choreographer's Fellowship, National Endowment for the Arts
- 1998: Living Treasure in American Dance award, Oklahoma City University, Ann Lacy School of American Dance
- 1999: National Heritage Fellowship, National Endowment for the Arts
- 2001: Recipient of the first Charles "Honi" Coles Award
- 2001: along with mentee Rocky Mendes, awarded a Traditional Arts Apprenticeship by the Mass Cultural Council
- 2002: Honorary Doctorate of Performing Arts in American Dance, Oklahoma City University, School of American Dance and Entertainment
- 2002: Hoofer Award, American Tap Dance Foundation
- 2003: Fellowship for Creative Arts in Choreography, John Simon Guggenheim Memorial Foundation
- 2005: Dance Magazine award
- 2007: Slyde and Mendes, Traditional Arts Apprenticeship, Mass Cultural Council
- 2008: Inducted into the International Tap Dance Hall of Fame

== See also ==
- List of dancers
