= Chuck Green =

American dancer

- Born: Charles Green; November 6, 1919; Fitzgerald, Georgia, United States
- Died: March 7, 1997 (aged 77); Oakland, California, United States
- Occupation: Tap dancer

Charles Green (November 6, 1919 – March 7, 1997) was an American tap dancer. Green was born in Fitzgerald, Georgia. He would stick bottle caps on his bare feet as a child and tap dance on the sidewalk for money. He won third place in a dance contest in 1925, in which Noble Sissle was the bandleader. Soon, Green would be touring the South tap dancing.

When he was nine he was brought to New York by a talent scout to study tap dancing. A famous talent agent, Nat Nazzaro, signed Green up as a client when he was just twelve years old. He and his childhood friend James Walker teamed up and called themselves "Shorty and Slim". Walker was a talented comic dancer and would be "Slim" to Green's "Shorty".

They changed their name to "Chuck and Chuckles," and played New York's Palace Theatre. Described as a modern Buck and Bubbles, Chuckles, an expert in legomania, played the vibes, while Green performed tap in a breathtaking yet gentle style of John Bubbles, whose protégé' he later became. Up until 1944, "Chuck and Chuckles" toured Europe, Australia, and the United States, performing in such venues as Radio City Music Hall, the Paramount, Apollo, and Capital theatres. Jobs were plentiful and they would double up on performances, averaging five stage shows a day, playing nightclubs until early morning, and touring nonstop with big bands across the country and abroad. In 1944, due to Green's stress, the team broke up and Green was committed to a mental institution where he stayed for fifteen years.

Upon his release in 1959, Green had become very introverted, but he could still dance. He quickly adapted to bebop and created his own style of tap dancing, experimenting with new harmonies and rhythmic patterns. He could easily ad-lib his dance numbers to the new music. He began performing again, on stage and on television.

He appeared at the Newport Jazz Festival on July 6, 1963, along with Honi Coles. Then, in 1964, Green faced tap dancer Groundhog in a tap challenge at the Village Vanguard. In 1969, Green appeared with members of Harlem's Hoofers Club for a series of "Tap Happenings" that were produced in New York City by Letitia Jay. Through the 1970s and 1980s, Green performed with the Copasetics. Honi Coles would introduce him as, "Chuck Green, the greatest tap dancer in the world." In 1979, Green was featured in the documentary film No Maps on My Taps.

In 2003, Green was inducted into the Tap Dance Hall of Fame.

Chuck Green died on March 7, 1997, at the Oakridge Care Center in Oakland, Calif.,

== Filmography ==
Year	Title	Role	Notes
1969	Putney Swope	Myron X alias Rufus	
1970	Pound	Mutt	
1979	No Maps on My Taps	Himself	
1985	About Tap	Himself	
1985	The Cotton Club Remembered	Himself	
