= Charles Coles =

American actor and tap dancer (1911–1992)

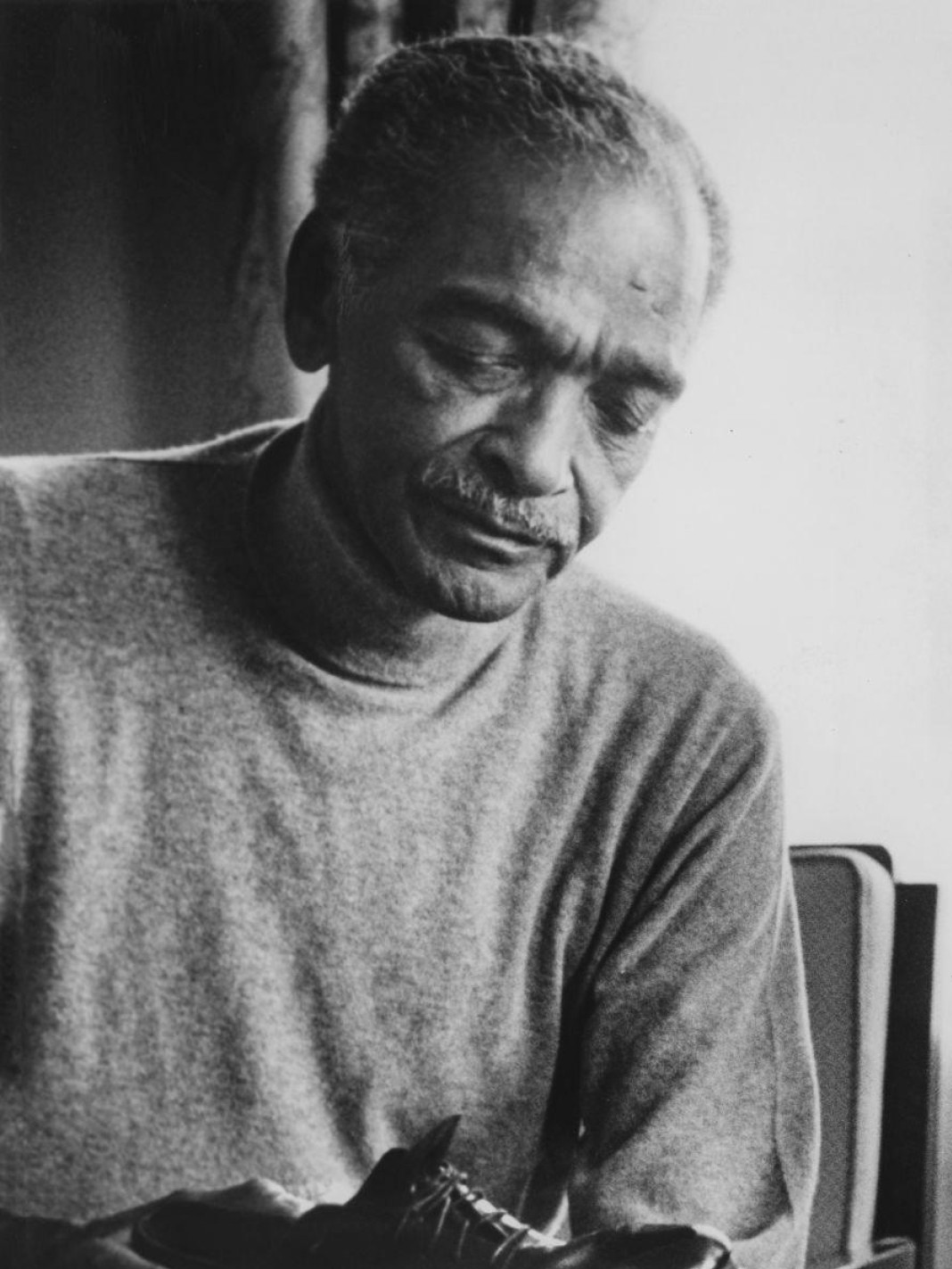
- Coles in 1985
- Born: April 2, 1911; Philadelphia, Pennsylvania, U.S.
- Died: November 12, 1992 (aged 81); New York City, New York, U.S.
- Occupations: Tap dancer, actor
- Years active: 1940–1992
- Spouse: Marion Edwards Coles (1915–2009) (m. 1944)

Charles "Honi" Coles (April 2, 1911 – November 12, 1992) was an American actor and tap dancer, who was inducted posthumously into the American Tap Dance Hall of Fame in 2003. He had a distinctive personal style that required technical precision, high-speed tapping, and a close-to-the-floor style where "the legs and feet did the work". Coles was also half of the professional tap dancing duo Coles and Atkins, whose specialty was performing with elegant style through various tap steps such as "swing dance", "over the top", "bebop", "buck and wing", and "slow drag".

He appeared in the films The Cotton Club and Dirty Dancing, as well as the documentary Great Feats of Feet. Coles was also a tap-dancing companion of tap dancer Brenda Bufalino, the founder and director of the American Tap Dance Foundation. During his career, Coles was awarded the Dance Magazine Award in 1985, the Capezio Award for lifetime achievement in dance in 1988, and the National Medal of the Arts by President George H. W. Bush in 1991. He was a tap mentor who believed, "If you can walk, you can tap." Coles advocated for the development of tap dance and often claimed that "tap dance was the only dance art form that America could claim as its own".

== Early life ==
Charles "Honi" Coles was born in Philadelphia, Pennsylvania, on April 2, 1911. He was the son of George and Isabel Coles. George Coles was an owner of a pool hall and a barbershop, while Isabel Coles was a domestic servant. When Coles was a child, his sister took care of him and gave Coles the nickname "Honey". Later, when he was around 14 or 15 years old, Coles belonged to a club called the Jolly Buccaneers and changed the spelling of his nickname to "Honi". This nickname became a crucial part of Coles's life, in which his teachers also used to call him Honi.

As a child, "Honi" Coles could not afford to go to dancing school, so he figured out a different way to learn how to tap dance. Coles and his friends gathered around the street corner of Philadelphia in the summer months to dance as a form of recreation. Later, other guys from different neighborhoods joined Coles and his friends, which created various competitions among young tap dancers. Billy Bailey, a talented dancer coming from another neighborhood, also competed on the street corner. Through watching other people tap-danced and joining such contests, Coles and his friends began to master various sets of dance steps, but "with no thought of using dancing as a means of livelihood".

By his late teens, after years of learning and practicing tap-dancing on the streets of Philadelphia, Coles was determined to make a career in show business. He practiced alone for a year to enhance his skill set, including speed, number of taps per beat, and complicated patterns. Although Coles was taller and slimmer than average tap dancers, he managed to maximize the potential of his physical appearance. Coles's fellow tap dancer, Pete Nugent, said that Coles could do "centipede steps," which means that his legs and feet could be pulled in opposite directions.

== Career ==
=== 1931 – 1935 ===
In 1931, Charles "Honi" Coles made his debut at the Lafayette Theater, a popular black venue at that time, in New York City as one of the Three Millers. They were popular for their fast moves, including over-the-tops, barrel turns, and wings, on six-foot-high pedestals. However, his partners hired another dancer to replace him, so Coles moved back to Philadelphia with a determination to perfect his fast-step style.

After spending time improving his technique, Coles returned to New York City in 1934 and performed at the Harlem Opera House and Apollo Theater. When practicing at Joe Price's acrobatics studio in downtown New York, Coles encountered some white dancers who came to challenge him. However, after Coles showed them his routines, the dancers walked away with confusion about his talent. With his fast-rhythm technique, he was highly respected and reputed to have "the fastest feet in show business" by other tap dancers. At the Hoofer's Club, a challenging stage for most talented tap dancers to compete in Harlem, Coles was still considered "the most graceful dancer ever seen" by his peers.

=== 1936 – 1939 ===
From 1936 to 1939, Coles replaced a member of the Lucky Seven Trio, who were the rivals to the Millers. Lucky Seven Trio was a group tapping on large cubes that looked like dice and going through ten costume changes during their act. In 1938, Coles teamed up with a comedian and then went single again. Through the tour with the big swing bands of Count Basie and Duke Ellington, Coles polished his technique, successfully combining high-speed tapping with an elegant style.

=== 1940 – 1960 ===
==== Coles and Atkins ====
In 1940, while performing as a dance soloist with Cab Calloway and his jive-swing orchestra, Coles met Charles "Cholly" Atkins. Atkins is a well-known jazz tap dancer, who choreographed, staged, and staged acts for many vocal groups of the 1960s. "Honi" Coles's specialty was precision and fast-rhythm steps, while Atkins was an expert wing dancer known as "the man with the moves".

In 1943, both of them joined the Army during wartime. In 1946, after the war ended, they combined their unique techniques and styles to form the class act of Coles & Atkins and were hired to perform at the Apollo Theater in Harlem. Their performance was popular because of their tailored suits, a precision swing dance in union, followed by a soft-shoe, and ended by a challenge dance, in which each dancer demonstrated his specialty. While Coles showcased his high-speed tapping and cadences of bebop, Atkins was more light-footed and combined tap with modern dance and ballet. Together, they ended the performance with precision steps and a walk offstage.

Coles and Atkins soft-shoe was a masterpiece in adagio dancing, but their most significant achievement was the assemblage of tap dancers in a class act with a set musical arrangement coming from the bands. During their career as a duo, Coles and Atkins worked with a lot of drummers, including Cozy Cole, Jo Jones, Sonny Payne, and Buddy Rich. The duo loved working with Jo Jones because he showed respect for dancers and knew how to accompany and provide music support for tap. They tried to develop a system in order to efficiently collaborate with drummers and musicians.

Throughout the 1940s, Coles and Atkins appeared in a series of tours with the big bands of Cab Calloway, Louis Armstrong, Lionel Hampton, Charlie Barnet, Billy Eckstine, Count Basie, Johnny Otis, and Billie Holiday. In late 1946, they performed the El Grotto in Chicago at Sixty-fourth and South Cottage Grove Avenue with Ziggy Johnson. After the El Grotto ended, Ziggy asked if the duo wanted to go with him to the Plantation, so they moved back to New York. In 1947, Coles and Atkins went on a tour with Count Basie to the West Coast on a northern route, then came back with Billy Eckstine's band following a southern route. During the summer of 1947, they performed with The Ink Spots, in which Johnny Otis was a band leader, in a "slow-motion acrobatic dance, using jazz movements". Additionally, Coles and Atkins also created choreography for June Taylor dancers for early television.

In the late 1940s, Coles and Atkins realized that the audiences became less interested in "pure" tap. In a performance at the Look-out House in Kentucky, they began to add comedy to their performance, but only gained partial success. In 1949, their creation of the show-stopping Mamie is Mimi, a part of the Broadway musical Gentlemen Prefer Blondes at the Ziegfeld Theater, went uncredited by the show's choreographer Agnes de Mille.

By the time Gentlemen Prefer Blondes ended in 1952, Coles and Atkins found that jobs were scarce as the integration of a new style of Broadway ballet became more popular than tap dance. As a result, each dancer took new jobs. Coles opened a dance studio with Pete Nugent, while Atkins became a vocal coach for many vocal bands. Although Coles and Atkins continued to work in the 1950s, they could not overcome the decline in audience's interest and eventually broke up in 1960.

==== Collaboration with Pete Nugent ====
During the period 1954–1955, Coles collaborated with Pete Nugent, a talented tap dancer from Washington, D.C., to open the Dance Craft studio on Fifty-second Street in New York City in spite of the ongoing decrease in the interest in tap dance in the 1950s. However, their studio closed in 1957 due to the prevalent loss in interest. Coles recalled that difficult period, "No work, no money. Tap had dropped dead."

Honi Coles met Brenda Bufalino during this period at his Dance Craft studio. When Bufalino was eighteen, she moved to New York City to further her dance studies in 1955. At his dance studio, Coles taught his fast-rhythm tap dancing and his other tap steps to Bufalino.

=== 1960 – 1970 ===
After Coles and Atkins broke up in 1960, Coles started working as a production stage manager for the Apollo Theater for the next sixteen years. Some of his responsibilities included introducing other class acts. "Honi" Coles described the Apollo chorus line and the Apollo performances, "A dancing act could come into the Apollo with all original material and when they left at the end of the week, the chorus line would have stolen many of the outstanding things that they did."

Additionally, Coles served as the president of the Negro Actors Guild and continued his association with the Copasetics, a club for musical and tap artists to preserve the memory of Bill "Bojangles" Robinson. During the 1950s and 60s, the Copasetics played an important social force in the Harlem community as "Polo theater", with annual balls and charitable performances to raise funds for children. In 1962, Coles performed at the Newport Jazz Festival, and his performance brought veteran members of the Copasetics back to the stage. Members of the Copasetics mentored and performed with the proceeding generation of female tap pioneers, including Brenda Bufalino, Jane Goldberg, and Deborah Mitchell.

=== 1970 – 1990 ===
Coles joined the tour of Bubbling Brown Sugar and performed the role of John Sage in 1976. He regained his popularity as a soloist, and was able to perform at Carnegie Hall and Town Hall. In 1978, after receiving compliments for his performance in the Joffrey Ballet production of Agnes de Mille's Conversations on the Dance, Coles emphasized the influence of tap dance in the world of concert dance.

After the success of the documentary Great Feats of Feet in 1977, Coles joined Brenda Bufalino in their duet concert of The Morton Gould Tap Concerto and toured the United States and England. Singing, Swinging, and Winging was Bufalino's first major performance, and Honi Coles, as a guest tap dancer, appeared midway through the second half of the program with Honi's Suite. Honi's Suite is a combination of musical compositions, monologue, and choreography performed by Bufalino and Coles, including "Let's Dance," "Get Yourself Another Guy," "Don't Get Caught Short on Love," "Warm Feet," and the signature soft-shoe of Coles and Atkins–"Taking A Chance On Love."

After Singing, Swinging, and Winging, Coles continued to work with Bufalino. In 1979, they created a tap choreography for The Morton Gourt Tap Concerto, performed with the Brooklyn Academy Philharmonic Orchestra. Following the success of this performance, they collaborated to choreograph Sounds of Music. Their successful collaboration highlighted the interplay of different races within the tap community. Bufalino said about their collaboration and friendship, "the white vaudevillian, the black vaudevillian. It was a wonderful show but it was hard to book because we were black and white." When being asked about the reason he taught his tapping skill to a white woman, specifically Bufalino, Coles responded to his peers, "Because no blacks want it, and she does, and because nobody else can do it, and she can." The connection and creative ties between Coles and Bufalino were continued for the next fifteen years.

In 1983, Coles performed with Tommy Tune in My One and Only, a Broadway musical show at the St. James Theater. After his show-stopping duet with Tune, Coles was reputed to have "an understated exercise in precise terpsichorean pointillism". Jack Kroll described Coles's feet in Newsweek as "have the delicacy and power of a master pianist's hands."

In 1984, Coles appeared in Jane Goldberg's The Tapping Talk Show, which was presented at the Village Gate from March 2 to March 3. The show was produced by Pamela Koslow and directed by Mercedes Ellington, featuring the guests Cookie Cook, Marion Coles, Buster Brown, Chinky Grimes, and Beverly Wasser. The Tapping Talk Show combined both veteran and female tap dancers.

During the 1980s, also Coles taught dance and dance history at Yale, Cornell, Duke, and George Washington University.

== Television and notable performances ==
=== Notable performances ===
- Taking A Chance On Love with Coles and Atkins
- Newport Jazz Festival (1962)
- Singing, Swinging, and Winging (1978)
- Sounds in Motion (1979)
- By Word of Foot (1980)
- Shoot Me while I'm Happy
- Swinging Taps (1980)
- Black Broadway (1980)
- The Essence of Rhythm
- My One and Only (1983)
- The Tapping Talk Show (1984)

=== Film and television appearances ===
Coles has appeared in the films The Cotton Club (1984) and Dirty Dancing (1987), as well as the documentary "Great Feats of Feet" (1977). Some of his television performances include The Tap Dance Kid, Mr. Griffin and Me, Conversations in Dance, Charleston, Archives of a Master, and Dance in America's Tap Dance in America for PBS. The 1963 Camera Three television program showcased Coles and Atkins' Soft Shoe and Over the Top with Bebop, which was narrated by jazz historian Marshall Stearns.

Year	Title	Role	Notes
1956	Basin Street Revue	Himself	
1979	Rocky II	Singer	
1984	Cotton Club	Suger Coates	
1987	Dirty Dancing	Tito Suarez	(final film role)

== Personal life ==
In 1944, Coles married Marion Evelyn Edwards, a dancer in the Number One chorus at the Apollo Theater, and together, Coles and his wife had two children.

On November 12, 1992, Charles "Honi" Coles died from cancer in Queens County, New York, aged 81. On November 6, 2009, his wife Marion Coles died in Queens County, New York, at the age of 94.

== Awards ==
In 1983, Coles received the Tony Award, Fred Astaire Award, and Drama Desk Award for best-featured actor and dancer in My One and Only, a popular Broadway musical starring Tommy Tune. Coles was awarded the Dance Magazine Award in 1985 and the Capezio Award for lifetime achievement in dance in 1988. In 1991, he was awarded the National Medal of Arts by President George H. W. Bush.
