= 33rd Tony Awards =

1979 US theatrical awards ceremony

- Date: June 3, 1979
- Location: Shubert Theatre; New York City, New York
- Hosted by: Jane Alexander; Henry Fonda; Liv Ullmann
- Most wins: Sweeney Todd (8)
- Most nominations: Sweeney Todd (9)

Television/radio coverage
- Network: CBS

The 33rd Annual Tony Awards was broadcast by CBS television on June 3, 1979, from the Shubert Theatre in New York City. The hosts were Jane Alexander, Henry Fonda and Liv Ullmann.

== Eligibility ==
Shows that opened on Broadway during the 1978–1979 season before May 31, 1979 are eligible.

Original plays

- Are You Now or Have You Ever Been
- Bedroom Farce
- Bosoms and Neglect
- Break a Leg
- The Crucifer of Blood
- The Elephant Man
- Faith Healer
- First Monday in October
- G. R. Point
- Gorey Stories
- The Kingfisher
- Knockout
- Manny
- A Meeting by the River
- Murder at the Howard Johnson's
- On Golden Pond
- The Playboy of the Weekend World
- Players
- Spokesong
- St. Mark's Gospel
- Strangers
- Taxi Tales
- Tribute
- Trick
- Whose Life Is It Anyway?
- Wings
- Zoot Suit

Original musicals

- The American Dance Machine
- Ballroom
- The Best Little Whorehouse in Texas
- A Broadway Musical
- Carmelina
- Eubie!
- The Grand Tour
- I Remember Mama
- King of Hearts
- My Old Friends
- Platinum
- Saravá
- Sweeney Todd: The Demon Barber of Fleet Street
- They're Playing Our Song
- The Utter Glory of Morrissey Hall

Play revivals

- The Goodbye People
- The Government Inspector
- Man and Superman
- Once in a Lifetime

Musical revivals

- Stop the World - I Want to Get Off
- Whoopee!

== The ceremony ==
The presenters were Tom Bosley, Barry Bostwick, Ellen Burstyn, Georgia Engel, Jane Fonda, Celeste Holm, John Houseman, Barnard Hughes, Angela Lansbury, Ron Leibman, Jack Lemmon, Hal Linden, Jean Marsh, Al Pacino and Dick Van Dyke.

The theme of the ceremony was theatrical superstitions, and various other showbusiness beliefs.

Henry Fonda received a Special Award, which was presented by his daughter Jane Fonda. Walter Cronkite presented Richard Rodgers with his Special Award.

Musicals represented:

- Ballroom ("Fifty Percent" - Dorothy Loudon)
- The Best Little Whorehouse in Texas ("The Aggie Song" - Company)
- Eubie ("Hot Feet" - Gregory Hines)
- I Remember Mama ("A Little Bit More" - Liv Ullmann, George Hearn and Company)
- Sweeney Todd: The Demon Barber of Fleet Street ("The Worst Pies in London" - Angela Lansbury)
- They're Playing Our Song ("They're Playing Our Song" - Robert Klein and Lucie Arnaz)

== Winners and nominees ==
Winners are in bold

Best Play	Best Musical
**The Elephant Man – Bernard Pomerance**; Bedroom Farce – Alan Ayckbourn; Whose Life Is It Anyway? – Brian Clark; Wings – Arthur Kopit	**Sweeney Todd: The Demon Barber of Fleet Street**; Ballroom; The Best Little Whorehouse in Texas; They're Playing Our Song
Best Book of a Musical	Best Original Score (Music and/or Lyrics) Written for the Theatre
**Hugh Wheeler – Sweeney Todd**; Jerome Kass – Ballroom; Larry L. King and Peter Masterson – The Best Little Whorehouse in Texas; Neil Simon – They're Playing Our Song	**Sweeney Todd – Stephen Sondheim (music and lyrics)**; Carmelina – Burton Lane (music) and Alan Jay Lerner (lyrics); Eubie! – Eubie Blake (music) and Noble Sissle, Andy Razaf, F. E. Miller, Johnny Brandon and Jim Europe (lyrics); The Grand Tour – Jerry Herman (music and lyrics)
Best Performance by a Leading Actor in a Play	Best Performance by a Leading Actress in a Play
**Tom Conti – Whose Life Is It Anyway? as Ken Harrison**; Philip Anglim – The Elephant Man as John Merrick; Jack Lemmon – Tribute as Scottie Templeton; Alec McCowen – St. Mark's Gospel as Mark	**Constance Cummings – Wings as Emily Stilson**; **Carole Shelley – The Elephant Man as Madge Kendal**; Jane Alexander – First Monday in October as Ruth Loomis; Frances Sternhagen – On Golden Pond as Ethel Thayer
Best Performance by a Leading Actor in a Musical	Best Performance by a Leading Actress in a Musical
**Len Cariou – Sweeney Todd as Sweeney Todd**; Vincent Gardenia – Ballroom as Alfred Rossi; Joel Grey – The Grand Tour as S. L. Jacobowsky; Robert Klein – They're Playing Our Song as Vernon Gersch	**Angela Lansbury – Sweeney Todd as Mrs. Lovett**; Tovah Feldshuh – Saravá as Flor; Dorothy Loudon – Ballroom as Bea Asher; Alexis Smith – Platinum as Lila Halliday
Best Performance by a Featured Actor in a Play	Best Performance by a Featured Actress in a Play
**Michael Gough – Bedroom Farce as Ernest**; Bob Balaban – The Inspector General as Óssip; Joseph Maher – Spokesong as The Trick Cyclist; Edward James Olmos – Zoot Suit as El Pachuco	**Joan Hickson – Bedroom Farce as Delia**; Laurie Kennedy – Man and Superman as Violet Robinson; Susan Littler – Bedroom Farce as Kate; Mary-Joan Negro – Wings as Amy
Best Performance by a Featured Actor in a Musical	Best Performance by a Featured Actress in a Musical
**Henderson Forsythe – The Best Little Whorehouse in Texas as Sheriff Ed Earl Dodd**; Richard Cox – Platinum as Dan Danger; Gregory Hines – Eubie! as Performer; Ron Holgate – The Grand Tour as Colonel Tadeusz Boleslav Stjerbinsky	**Carlin Glynn – The Best Little Whorehouse in Texas as Mona Stangley**; Joan Ellis – The Best Little Whorehouse in Texas as Shy; Millicent Martin – King of Hearts as Madame Madeleine; Maxine Sullivan – My Old Friends as Mrs. Cooper
Best Direction of a Play	Best Direction of a Musical
**Jack Hofsiss – The Elephant Man**; Alan Ayckbourn and Peter Hall – Bedroom Farce; Paul Giovanni – The Crucifer of Blood; Michael Lindsay-Hogg – Whose Life Is It Anyway?	**Harold Prince – Sweeney Todd**; Michael Bennett – Ballroom; Peter Masterson and Tommy Tune – The Best Little Whorehouse in Texas; Robert Moore – They're Playing Our Song
Best Choreography	Best Scenic Design
**Michael Bennett and Bob Avian – Ballroom**; Henry LeTang and Billy Wilson – Eubie!; Dan Siretta – Whoopee!; Tommy Tune – The Best Little Whorehouse in Texas	**Eugene Lee – Sweeney Todd**; Karl Eigsti – Knockout; David Jenkins – The Elephant Man; John Wulp – The Crucifer of Blood
Best Costume Design	Best Lighting Design
**Franne Lee – Sweeney Todd**; Theoni V. Aldredge – Ballroom; Ann Roth – The Crucifer of Blood; Julie Weiss – The Elephant Man	**Roger Morgan – The Crucifer of Blood**; Ken Billington – Sweeney Todd; Beverly Emmons – The Elephant Man; Tharon Musser – Ballroom

== Special awards ==
- Lawrence Langner Memorial Award for Distinguished Lifetime Achievement in the American Theatre - Richard Rodgers
- Regional Theatre Award - American Conservatory Theater, San Francisco, California
- Henry Fonda
- Walter F. Diehl, International President of Theatrical Stage Employees and Moving Picture Operators, has been an active force in advancing the well-being of the Broadway theatre and of theatre nationally.
- Eugene O'Neill Memorial Theatre Center, Waterford, Connecticut

=== Multiple nominations and awards ===
These productions had multiple nominations:

- 9 nominations: Sweeney Todd
- 8 nominations: Ballroom
- 7 nominations: The Best Little Whorehouse in Texas and The Elephant Man
- 5 nominations: Bedroom Farce
- 4 nominations: The Crucifer of Blood and They're Playing Our Song
- 3 nominations: Eubie!, The Grand Tour, Whose Life Is It Anyway? and Wings
- 2 nominations: Platinum

The following productions received multiple awards.

- 8 wins: Sweeney Todd
- 3 wins: The Elephant Man
- 2 wins: Bedroom Farce and The Best Little Whorehouse in Texas

== See also ==
- Drama Desk Awards
- 1979 Laurence Olivier Awards – equivalent awards for West End theatre productions
- Obie Award
- New York Drama Critics' Circle
- Theatre World Award
- Lucille Lortel Awards
