= Flo-Bert Award =

Award for tap dance

- Description: Honors outstanding figures in the field of tap dance
- Country: United States

The Flo-Bert Award honors "outstanding figures in the field of tap dance".

== History ==
Named for eminent African-American performers Florence Mills and Bert Williams, the awards began in 1991. Flo-Bert, Ltd, the non-profit organization that makes the selections, was founded by historian and researcher Delilah Jackson in 1989. The organization is sponsored by the New York Foundation for the Arts.

The Flo-Bert Award is given annually. Honorees include Gregory Hines, Cab Calloway, Gene Kelly, Savion Glover, and the Nicholas Brothers. The award is meant to recognize life achievement in performing, teaching or supporting the art of tap dance.

The organization holds an awards show, The Tap Extravaganza. It is produced by The New York Committee to Celebrate National Tap Dance Day.

== Honorees ==
listed alphabetically; year of award indicated:

Honoree	Description	Year
Jerry Ames	founder and artistic director of Jerry Ames Tap Dance Company	2006
Maceo Anderson	original member of The Four Step Brothers, early innovator of the acrobatic tap style	1994
Cholly Atkins	partner of Charles "Honi" Coles"; Motown choreographer	1993
Bob Audy		2007
Jean Bach		2008
Clayton "Peg Leg" Bates"		1991
John Bedford		2006
Phil Black		1996
Bunny Briggs		1999
Ernest "Brownie" Brown	member of the Hoofer's Club, original member of The Original Copasetics, half of vaudeville duo Cook and Brown	2003
Brenda Bufalino	creator and choreographer for the American and International Tap Dance Orchestras	1999
Cab Calloway	dancer and bandleader	1992
Lon Chaney		1991
Heather Cornell	co-founder of Manhattan Tap	2012
The Cotton Club Girls		1992
Harold Cromer	Stumpy of the tap team Stump and Stumpy	2005
Stanley Donen	film director (Singing in the Rain, Seven Brides for Seven Brothers)	2003
Paul Draper	partner of Larry Adler	1993
Arthur Duncan		2004
Mercedes Ellington	choreographer, dancer, producer; first black member of the June Taylor Dancers, granddaughter of Duke Ellington	2009
Savion Glover	star of Bring in da Noise, Bring in da Funk	2000
Yvette Glover	mother of Savion Glover	2007
Jane Goldberg	tap performer and historian	2002
Chuck Green		1991
Ralph Guild		2006
Lionel Hampton	musician	1995
Barry Harris	pianist, composer and teacher	1998
George Hillman		1991
Gregory Hines	brother of Maurice Hines	1998
Maurice Hines	brother of Gregory Hines	2008
Milt Hinton	jazz bassist	1997
Melba Huber		1996
Delilah Jackson	founded Flo-Bert, Ltd. and the Flo-Bert Awards	2001
Gene Kelly		1994
Sali Ann Kriegsman		1997
Mable Lee	singer-dancer, one of the original Apollo Girls	2004
Jeni LeGon	member of the Whitman Sisters	2001
Henry LeTang	taught Gregory Hines; choreographer of the movies Tap and The Cotton Club, Broadway plays Eubie, Black and Blue and Sophisticated Ladies	1995
Bernard Manners		1991
Frankie Manning	member of Whitey's Lindy Hoppers	2004
Ann Miller		1994
Deborah Mitchell	founder of the New Jersey Tap Ensemble	2007
Cobi Narita		2005
The Nicholas Brothers		1992
Donald O'Connor		1997
Frank Ownes	pianist/arranger/composer	2002
Radio City Rockettes		1996
Leonard Reed	inventor of the Shim Sham Shimmy	2000
LaVaughn Robinson		2005
Jo Rowan		2006
The Silver Belles		1992
Randy Skinner		2010
Jimmy Slyde		1991
Prince Spencer	one of the Four Step Brothers	2009
Peggy Spina		2008
Bross Townsend	pianist	1996
Tommy Tune		2003
Dianne Walker		2003
George Wein	originator of the Newport Jazz Festival	2004
Ruth Williams	founder of the Ruth Williams Dance Studio in Harlem	1996
