= Julianne Boyd =

American theatre director

- Born: December 22, 1944 (age 81)
- Education: Beaver College (B.A.); City University of New York (Ph.D.)
- Occupations: Theatre director; artistic director

Julianne Parks Boyd (born December 22, 1944) is an American theatre director and was the Founding Artistic Director of the Barrington Stage Company of Pittsfield, Massachusetts. She retired in 2022.

== Education ==
Born in 1944, Boyd received a B.A. in Theater and Education from Beaver College (now known as Arcadia University) in Pennsylvania, and a doctorate in Theater from the City University of New York.

== Barrington Stage Company ==
Boyd is the founder (1995) and artistic director of the Berkshire-based Barrington Stage Company (BSC). The company, which was originally based in Sheffield, Massachusetts, moved to Pittsfield, Massachusetts, in 2006. Barrington Stage Company produced the world premiere of William Finn and Rachel Sheinkin's musical The 25th Annual Putnam County Spelling Bee in 2004, which garnered two Tony Awards (Rachel Sheinkin for Outstanding Book, and Dan Fogler for Outstanding Male Performer in a Musical) when it moved to Broadway in 2005. Barrington Stage also produced the world premiere of Mark St. Germain's Freud’s Last Session in 2009, starring Martin Rayner and Mark H. Dold. It later moved Off-Broadway and played for two years. In October 2014, Barrington Stage's 2013 production of On The Town, directed by John Rando and choreographed by Josh Bergasse, opened on Broadway at the Lyric Theatre.

== Directing ==
Boyd conceived and directed the 1978 Broadway production of Eubie!, a musical revue based on the works of Eubie Blake which she also conceived. The production starred Gregory Hines and Maurice Hines, and received three Tony Award nominations. She also conceived and directed the musical revue A... My Name Is Alice in 1983–84 with Joan Micklin Silver, and its sequel A…My Name Is Still Alice at the Second Stage, NYC in 1992. Boyd has directed at regional theatres nationwide, including The Old Globe (As You Like It and Velina Hasu Houston's Tea), the McCarter and Asolo Theatres (Sweet and Hot: the Music of Harold Arlen) and Syracuse Stage (The Country Wife).

She directed the world premiere of playwright Mark St. Germain’s Dr. Ruth All The Way (2012) at Barrington Stage. It is now entitled Becoming Dr Ruth, and she also directed it Off-Broadway in the fall of 2013. Set in 1997, it is about the life of sex therapist, Holocaust survivor, and author Dr. Ruth Westheimer.

She also directed The Best of Enemies (2011), and the world premiere of St. Germain's Dancing Lessons (2014). At BSC, she also directed productions of Cabaret, Follies, Sweeney Todd, All My Sons, and An Enemy of the People, among others.

She served on the board of directors of the Stage Directors and Choreographers Society (SDC) from 1980 to 1998, and as president from 1992 to 1998.
