= Ernest Brown (dancer) =

American dancer (1916–2009)

Ernest "Brownie" Brown (April 25, 1916 – August 21, 2009) was an African American tap dancer and last surviving member of the Original Copasetics. He was the dance partner of Charles "Cookie" Cook, with whom he performed from the days of vaudeville into the 1960s, and of Reginald McLaughlin, also known as "Reggio the Hoofer," from 1996 until Brown's death in 2009.

== Early life ==
Ernest Brown was born on April 25, 1916, in Chicago, Illinois, where he professionally danced as a child.

== Career ==
=== Early career ===
At age thirteen, Brown met his longtime dance partner Charles “Cookie” Cook, with whom he performed until the 1960s. They performed in acts such as Garbage And His Two Cans, in which they played the garbage cans, and Sarah Venable's Mammy And Her Picks. They traveled around, touring on the Black vaudeville circuits, arriving back home in Chicago at the Riviera Theater. In 1930, they formed the dance team Cook & Brown and headed to New York.

Cookie and Brownie had developed a dancing and acrobatic routine combining comedy and slapstick humor with sophisticated choreography, character dynamics, and timing. They performed with Duke Ellington, Eartha Kitt, Count Basie, Lena Horne, Cab Calloway, and other jazz legends.

In 1934, Cookie and Brownie opened at New York's Cotton Club, and for over forty years, they headlined in vaudeville, performing at theaters such as New York's Palace, Palladium, Apollo, Roxy Theatre, Radio City Music Hall, the Cotton Club, and at the London Palladium and Latin Casino in Paris. They also appeared in Dorothy Dandridge’s 1942 “soundie” Cow Cow Boogie.

=== Copasetics ===
On December 5, 1949, Brown became a founding member of the Copasetics, a tap group honoring Bill “Bojangles” Robinson, who had died earlier that year, as well as reviving the art of tap. The Copasetics got their name from Bojangles’ famous expression “everything’s copasetic,” meaning “excellent,” and along with Brownie, the group consisted of composer Billy Strayhorn, choreographer Cholly Atkins, Charles “Cookie” Cook, and Honi Coles. Tap dance at this point was declining in popularity in favor of ballet and modern dance on Broadway, but the Copasetics kept it alive through annual dance reviews, boat trips, fundraisers and personal initiatives.

Brownie and Cookie performed the 1952 Broadway revival of the musical Kiss Me, Kate. The Copasetics also performed at the Newport Jazz Festival in 1963 in the “Old Hoofers” act, reviving tap after a fifteen-year decline. In the 1960s, the US State Department sponsored a tour of Africa, on which Cook and Brown performed for Haile Selassie, the emperor of Ethiopia.

=== Later career ===
Brownie appeared in the documentary Great Feats of Feet (1977) and Steps in Time (1979), and he taught at the historic By Word of Foot tap festival at the Village Gate (1980). During the 1980s revival of tap, he appeared in the film The Cotton Club (1984), starring Gregory and Maurice Hines, and at the 92nd Street Y in Fifty Years of Tap Dancing. He also performed at the Brooklyn Academy of Music in Tappin' Uptown: A New Tap Musical; at City College's Aaron Davis Hall in An Evening with Charles Cook and Friends (1984); at Chicago's Goodman Theatre in Jane Goldberg's Shoot Me While I'm Happy (1985), at the Boston Opera House in The Great Tap Dance Reunion (1988), and at the Studio Museum of Harlem in Cookie and Friends (1989). Brown also performed at the 1984 Summer Olympic Games in Los Angeles, California.

Charles Cook died in 1991.

=== Partnership with Reggio McLaughlin ===
In 1994, when Brownie was 78, his granddaughter introduced him to a friend: Reginald McLaughlin, also known as "Reggio The Hoofer." This marked the beginning of a sixteen-year friendship and new dance partnership, and their first collaboration, choreographing 'Tommy Parker's Black Minstrel Show' for the Chicago Theatre Company, was nominated for a Black Theatre Alliance Award. They would continue to perform together until Brownie's death in 2009, reviving some of the original Copasetics’ numbers and Cook & Brown routines, including the Cane Dance, Chair Dance, and Soft Shoe.

In 2004, Brown was the recipient of the American Tap Dance Foundation's "Hoofer Award." One of his last performances was at the 2008 Tap City Festival in New York City with Reggio; with whom he also appeared in the Chicago Human Rhythm Project Emmy-nominated documentary, JUBA — Masters of Tap and Percussive Dance.

Brown died in Chicago on August 21, 2009, at the age of 93.

== Dance style ==
Brown was known for not only his acrobatics and knockabout comedy, but also his fluid and energetic dance style that complemented that of Charles "Cookie" Cook. This was emphasized by their heights: Cook was six feet tall, compared with Brown's five foot height and “a stage presence that was by turns hyperkinetic and regal.” In Brownie's obituary, tap historian Jane Goldberg wrote,

"He had an amazing sense of 'entitlement' in a good way. He always felt he belonged on the stage, shaking his shoulders in that jazzy, goofy move he was known for, even while Honi Coles was cutting Gregory Hines in a tap battle, or other of the greats were there. I don’t think Brownie was tap as much as jazz, and he had a wonderful feeling for jazz."
