= Eubie =

Eubie may refer to:

- Eubie Blake, a composer
- Eubie!, a 1978 Broadway musical
- Eubie, a fictional character in Higglytown Heroes
