= Catherine Cox (actress) =

American actress

- Born: Toledo, Ohio, U.S.
- Education: Wittenberg University (BA)
- Occupation(s): Stage, television actress

Catherine Cox is an American actress known for her appearances in television, film, and theatre.

== Early life and education ==
Cox is a native of Toledo, Ohio, whose mother sang with an all-female orchestra during World War II. Cox graduated from Wittenberg University with a degree in music education.

== Career ==
A regular on the Broadway stage in the 1980s, Cox's credits include the original Ethel McCormack in the production of Footloose, the musical Oh Coward!, for which she was nominated for a Tony Award for Best Performance by a Leading Actress in a Musical, and Baby for which she won the Drama Desk Award. Other Broadway credits include roles in Rumors, Music Is, Whoopee!, Barnum, and One Night Stand.

Cox has also worked extensively in regional theaters across the United States and in Off-Broadway productions in New York. Off-Broadway she has appeared in productions of William Finn's In Trousers, Rap Master Ronnie, By Strouse, It's Better With A Band, and The Waves. Cox's regional credits include the roles of Donna and Oolie in the Los Angeles production of City of Angels.

Her television appearances include The Cosby Show, Law & Order, The Guiding Light, and Edge of Night.

== Personal life ==
Cox is married to composer/musical director, David Evans and has two sons.

== Filmography ==
=== Film ===
Year	Title	Role	Notes
2007	Bunko	Cat	
2009	Tenderness	Bowling Waitress	

=== Television ===
Year	Title	Role	Notes
1984	The Edge of Night	Billie Shuman	2 episodes
1990	The Cosby Show	Bernice Phelps	Episode: "It's a Boy"
2002, 2006	Law & Order	Barbara / Mrs. Hatcher	2 episodes
