= My Old Friends (musical) =

1979 stage musical

- Music: Mel Mandel and Norman Sachs
- Lyrics: Mel Mandel and Norman Sachs
- Book: Mel Mandel and Norman Sachs
- Premiere: April 12, 1979: 22 Steps
- Productions: 1979 (Broadway); 1985 (Off-Broadway)

My Old Friends is a 1979 stage musical created by Mel Mandel and Norman Sachs.

== Synopsis ==
At the Golden Years retirement hotel, there's a mixed bag of guests, a little romance, plenty of time for song, a little dancing and lots of jokes.

== Production history ==
The show had an Off-Broadway run at the Orpheum Theatre beginning January 12, 1979. The show then transferred with the same cast to Broadway.

The show opened on Broadway on April 12, 1979, running for 53 performances at the now defunct Broadway theatre then known as 22 Steps. The show was directed by Philip Rose. The show was nominated for one Tony Award at the 33rd Tony Awards, for Maxine Sullivan in the category of Tony Award for Best Featured Actress in a Musical. Peter Walker was also nominated for a Drama Desk Award in the category of Outstanding Lead Actor in a Musical for his performance.

The show is available for licensing from Concord Theatricals. In 1985, an Off-Broadway revival was staged at the American Jewish Theater at the 92d Street YMCA. The production starred Imogene Coca and her husband, actor King Donovan in the lead roles, with Maxine Sullivan reprising her role from the original cast. In 2008, the show was performed at the Victory Theatre Center in Burbank, California.

== Musical numbers ==
- "I'm Not Old" - Residents
- "My Old Friends" - Peter
- "For Two Minutes" - Slocum, Arias, Catlan, Fineberg
- "What We Need Around Here" - Peter, Heloise
- "Oh, My Rose" - Peter
- "I Bought a Bicycle" - Fineberg
- "The Battle At Eagle Rock" - Heloise
- "Dear Jane" - Residents
- "The Only Place For Me" - Residents
- "I Work With Wood" - Peter, Slocum
- "Mambo 52" - Arias, Mrs. Cooper
- "A Little Starch Left" - Mrs. Cooper
- "Our Time Together" - Heloise
- "You've Got To Keep Building" - Peter

== Characters ==
- Peter Schermann - mid-sixties, was a carpenter for 40 years
- Heloise Michaud - mid-sixties, jolly and outgoing
- Mickey Catlan - mid-sixties, ex-vaudeville comic type
- Sidney Fineberg - mid-sixties, dapper-looking, distinguished somewhat formal, nattily dressed
- Wally Slocum - mix-sixties, portly Jack Oakie type
- Mrs. Cooper - mid-sixties, black woman, sarcastic and funny
- Arias - mid-sixties, Hispanic-Latin type
- Mrs. Polianoffsky - mid-sixties, eccentric old lady
- Mr. Gettlinger - mid-thirties or forties, executive director
- Mrs. Stone - off-stage voice of authority only appears at Curtain call
- Larry - a handyman.

== Original casts ==
Character	Broadway 1979	Off-Broadway 1985
Peter Schermann	Peter Walker	Peter Walker
Heloise Michaud	Sylvia Davis	Imogene Coca
Mickey Catlan	Allen Swift	King Donovan
Sidney Fineberg	Leslie Barrett	Norman Golden
Wally Slocum	Robert Weil	Robert Weil
Mrs. Cooper	Maxine Sullivan	Maxine Sullivan
Arias	Norberto Kerner	Norberto Kerner
Mr. Gettlinger / Larry	Fred Morsell	John Danelle
Mrs. Stone	Brenda Gardner	Jean Taylor
Mrs. Polianoffsky	Grace Carney	Grace Carney
