= Reginald McLaughlin =

American dancer and choreographer

Reggio "The Hoofer" McLaughlin, is an American tap dancer, instructor and choreographer.

He started his artistic career in the subways of Chicago, where he had developed his style of tap dance hoofing, characterized by raw form of African American Tap. The combination of African foot stomping, Irish step and his experience contributes to the world of tap dancing.

Reginald "The Hoofer" McLaughlin performed in various theatre shows and he worked with the pioneers of tap dance. As a principal tap dancer he was seen in two Duke Ellington musicals: Jump for Joy and Beggar's Holiday. In the theatre version of the Sammy Davis Jr. Story he played the role of Sammy Davis Sr. and choreographed the tap numbers. At the Marcus Center of the Performing Arts in Milwaukee he was the featured tap dancer and choreographer of a production called We are the Drum. For the 150th anniversary of the Chicago Tribune, Reggio was brought in as a specialty act with the Chicago Jazz Ensemble.

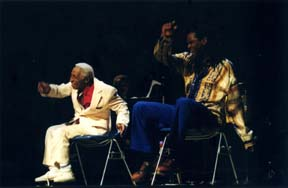
Reggio "the Hoofer"

Reggio has been featured on educational television programs such as Art Safari, Art Beat Chicago, and Inside Kentucky Schools. His feet are featured dancing to the documentary narration about singer Nat King Cole, and he also appears in "Gallery 37 a portrait of Chicago Youth" and "Vanishing Act". He has also been featured in JUBA: Masters of the Tap, a documentary that aired on PBS where he danced with his partner Ernest "Brownie" Brown, a legendary tap dancer who died in 2009 at the age of 93. There is currently being filmed an instructional video and a new documentary highlighting his friendship and dance relationship with Brown and the return to the Chair Dance routine, one of the classics of the 1930s. In 2004 Reginald "the Hoofer" obtained the prestigious Master Apprentice Award of Illinois Arts Council.

Reggio the Hoofer is currently the principal tap dance teacher at Old Town School of Folk Music in Chicago. He is the producer and writer of his annual Christmas show called The Nut Tapper, a percussive variation of the classic ballet from Tchaikovsky's Nutcracker Suite. The Nut Tapper is a recreation with rhythms of tap, Spanish gypsy flamenco, Mexican zapateado, and Appalachian clog. McLaughlin also creates special artistic programs for children in difficult environments and performs in children hospitals.

He is a recipient of a 2021 National Heritage Fellowship awarded by the National Endowment for the Arts, which is the United States government's highest honor in the folk and traditional arts.
