= Mary-Joan Negro =

American actress (born 1951)

- Born: January 9, 1951 (age 75); Yonkers, New York, USA
- Education: University of Michigan; Juilliard School
- Occupations: Actress; Director; Teacher
- Years active: 1973–Present
- Spouse: Norman Snow

Mary-Joan Negro (born January 9, 1951) is an actress of stage, film, and television. Negro has appeared in nearly fifty television shows and films and numerous stage productions since the early 1970s. Since the mid-1990s she also directs and teaches theatre in addition to her screen appearances.

== Early life and education ==
Negro was born in Yonkers, New York. After graduating with a BA in Drama and Language Arts from the University of Michigan, she was granted a Juilliard scholarship, and in 1970, joined the first class of the Drama Division under John Houseman, along with Kevin Kline and David Ogden Stiers. She graduated from the class in 1972, at which time Houseman wanted to form an equity company.

== Career ==
Theatre

Negro is a founding member of John Houseman's and Margot Harley's The Acting Company in New York City, and of Joseph Stern's Matrix Theatre Company in Los Angeles, and the Antaeus Theatre Company.

Her stage performances include Broadway, off-Broadway, and American repertory companies such as The Acting Company, San Diego's Old Globe Theatre, and the O'Neill Playwrights Conference in Connecticut.

Negro was nominated for a Tony Award as Best Featured Actress in a Play for her role in Arthur Kopit's Wings (1979), directed by John Madden.

Television and film

In 1976 as part of the Great Performances series, PBS produced and televised William Saroyan's play, The Time of Your Life featuring Keven Kline in which Negro played the role of Society Lady. Also in the 1970s, she began appearing on televisions series such as Kojak (1976) and The Andros Targets (1977), and the television movie The Family Man (1979). In 1983, she appeared on PBS in American Playhouse in an adaption of Kopit's Wings in the role of Amy. Other special appearance roles include Helen Matian in the ABC Afterschool Special episode, "Date Rape" (1988), and Barbara Fitts in the CBS Schoolbreak Special episode "Other Mothers" (1993).

Negro appeared twice on the CBS series The Equalizer. In the 1988 episode "The Child Broker" she played Irene Winters, the hard-working single mother of teenager Danny, played by Christopher Collet, who is being led into criminality by Shep Morrow, played by Thomas G. Waites. In the 1989 episode "Lullaby of Darkness" she portrays Rebecca Morrison, the belittled and battered wife of Joseph Morrison, played by Stephen Lang. Also in the 1980s, Negro appears on Another World (1982), Remington Steele (1983), two 1986 episodes of Spenser: For Hire, and the television movie The Littlest Victims (1989).

She had two roles on NBC's series Law & Order, the first in the 1991 episode "In Memory Of" and the second in 1994, "White Rabbit," in which she portrayed Rita Levitan, an alias for her real name, Susan Forrest. In "White Rabbit," Rita is accused of murdering a police officer 25 years prior, while committing a heist as Susan, a member of a radical anti-war group. Also in the 1990s, she had a recurring role as Roberta Braun on The Practice (1997), as well as roles on L.A. Law (1990), Touched by an Angel (1998), and the television movie The Patron Saint of Liars (1998).

In the 2001, Negro made guest appearances on NYPD Blue as Mary McElroy, Frasier as Joanne, and again on The Practice, this time in a new role as the plaintiff's attorney, Audrey Turner. She also appeared on Crossing Jordan (2002). In 2004 she appeared in Cold Case as Renee (2004) in a 1969 case hearkening back to the post-Summer of Love era in "Volunteers." That same year Negro played Pam Morton on CBS's legal drama Judging Amy, and appeared on Showtime's Huff. She also had roles on ABC's political drama Commander in Chief as Margaret Shoop, and as Emma Hadley in the medical drama ER, both in 2006

Negro's theatrical film appearances include Dominick and Eugene (1988), Employee of the Month (2004), Moonbeams (2001), and Mont Reve (2012).

== Personal life ==
Negro directs and teaches at venues that include The Acting Company, the Odyssey Theatre Ensemble in Los Angeles, the California Institute of the Arts, and at the University of Southern California where she is a Professor of Theatre Practice.

Mary-Joan Negro was married to fellow actor Norman Snow, who was also a member of John Houseman's The Acting Company.

== Awards ==
Mary-Joan Negro awards and nominations
Year	Award	Category	Result	Ref.
1979	Tony Award	Best Featured Actress in a Play; Arthur Kopit's Wings	Nominated	

== Stage roles ==
Some of Mary-Joan Negro theatre appearances include the following.

- 1973: The Beggar's Opera (Billy Rose Theatre) – Jenny Diver
- 1973: Measure for Measure (Billy Rose Theatre) – Isabella / Mariana
- 1973, 1975: The Three Sisters (Billy Rose Theatre, Harkness Theatre) – Masha
- 1975: Edward II (Harkness Theatre) – Queen Isabella
- 1975: The Time of Your Life (Harkness Theatre) – Society Lady
- 1979: Wings (Lyceum Theatre) – Amy
- 1981: Scenes and Revelations (Circle in the Square Theatre) – Charlotte
- 1981: King Richard II (Globe Playhouse, Los Angeles) – Queen Isabel
- 1985: The Loves of Anatol (Circle in the Square Theatre) – Cora / Emilie

== Filmography ==
Mary-Joan Negro film and television credits
Year	Title	Role	Notes	Ref.
1976	Great Performances: The Time of Your Life	Society Lady	PBS television version of William Saroyan's play	
1976	Kojak	Janet O'Connor	1 episode	
1977	The Andros Targets	Audrey Commack	1 episode	
1979	The Family Man	Oona	Television film	
1980	King Crab	Susan	Television film	
1982	King Richard II	Queen Isabel	Video of the play performed on a bare stage at Globe Playhouse, L.A.	
1982	Another World	Anne Whitelaw	2 episodes	
1983	Remington Steele	Beth	1 episode	
1983	Wings	Amy	Television adaptation of Arthur Kopit's 1978 Broadway production	
1985	No Big Deal	Miss Karnisian	Television film	
1986	Spenser: For Hire	Maggie Petrie, Etta Kaminski	2 episodes	
1988	ABC Afterschool Special	Helen Matian	Episode: "Date Rape" (S17.E1)	
1988	The Equalizer	Irene Winters	Episode: "The Child Broker"	
1989	The Equalizer	Rebecca Morrison	Episode: "Lullaby of Darkness"	
1989	The Littlest Victims	Mary Pryor	Television film	
1988	Dominick and Eugene	Theresa Chernak	Theatrical Film	
1990	Blind Faith	Paula Caccaro	Television miniseries	
1990	L.A. Law	Ellen Klein	1 episode	
1991	Empty Nest	Dr. Walker	1 episode	
1991	Law & Order	Julie Atkinson	Episode: "In Memory Of" (S2.E7)	
1992	Brooklyn Bridge	Lucille Scamparelli	1 episode	
1993	CBS Schoolbreak Special	Barbara Fitts	Episode: "Other Mothers"	
1993	Picket Fences	Maryann Taylor	1 episode	
1994	Law & Order	Susan Forester aka Rita Levitan	Episode: "White Rabbit" (S5.E5)	
1995	Ed Mcbain's 87th Precinct: Lightning	Mrs. Anuciato	Television film	
1995	Naomi & Wynonna: Love Can Build a Bridge	Billie Ciminella	Television miniseries	
1995	The Client	Mae Calhoun	1 episode	
1995	New York News	Unknown	1 episode	
1997	The Practice	Roberta Braun	4 episodes	
1997	Cracker: Mind Over Murder	Tina's Mother	1 episode	
1998	Touched by an Angel	Margaret Evans	Episode: "Redeeming Love"	
1998	Nothing Sacred	Christina	1 episode	
1998	The Patron Saint of Liars	Mrs. Stanton	Television film	
1999	Becker	Virginia Arras	1 episode	
1999	Family Law	Unknown	1 episode	
2000	Party of Five	Evvie's Sponsor	1 episode	
2001	NYPD Blue	Mary McElroy	Episode: "Nariz a Nariz"	
2001	Frasier	Joanne	Episode: "A Day in May"	
2001	The Practice	Plaintiff's Atty. Audrey Turner	Episode: "Honor Code"	
2002	Crossing Jordan	Nurse Alicia Gramble	1 episode	
2003	The Lyon's Den	Unknown	1 episode	
2004	Employee of the Month	Helen Goodwin	Theatrical Film	
2004	Cold Case	Renee (2004)	Episode: "Volunteers"	
2004	Judging Amy	Pam Morton	1 episode	
2004	Huff	Delmont	1 episode	
2005	Six Feet Under	Polina	Episode: "The Silence"	
2006	Commander in Chief	Margaret Shoop	2 episodes	
2006	ER	Emma Hadley	1 episode	
