= Mable Lee =

American jazz tap dancer, singer, and entertainer (1921–2019)

- Lee c. 1945.
- Born: August 2, 1921; Atlanta, Georgia, U.S.
- Died: February 7, 2019 (aged 97); New York City, New York, U.S.
- Other names: The Queen of Soundies; Mabel Lee
- Occupations: Tap dancer; singer
- Years active: 1934–2018

Mable Lee (August 2, 1921 – February 7, 2019), sometimes spelled Mabel Lee, was an American jazz tap dancer, singer, and entertainer. Lee appeared on Broadway, at the Apollo Theater, and was known as "Queen of the Soundies" due to her numerous performances in the films.

== Biography ==
Born in Atlanta, Georgia to Rosella Moore and Alton Lee, Mable Lee was a child prodigy who began performing when she was 4 years old, at age 9 was performing in local clubs with a big band and as a 12-year-old was appearing at the Top Hat nightclub in Georgia. Neither of her parents were in show business, but they would sing and dance around the house. When she was in grade school, she asked her principal to use the assembly room to put on entertainment shows, putting up posters, and making programs. Lee also sang and danced for her teachers growing up—they were all aware of her talent from an early age.

Her high school music teacher was Graham W. Jackson Sr. Amazed by her talent, he took her with him to perform, including for Franklin Delano Roosevelt to his vacation house in White Plains, Georgia.

Lee's mother and aunt were always supportive of her performance endeavors and went with her to every show growing up. The Whitman Sisters noticed her when she was performing at Top Hat, but her mother encouraged her to finish high school before moving to pursue her career.

She moved to New York City with her mother in 1940 to pursue a career as a singer and dancer, and soon joined the chorus of the Apollo Theater in Harlem. She also did acrobatics performed with a chair, which she referred to as her novelty. She simultaneously did vaudeville and nightclub shows. She auditioned and was chosen to perform at the West End Theatre. She subsequently worked at various nightclubs, before Dick Campbell sent her to London, where she spent 18 months and performed at the London Palladium. Regarding her work at the Palladium, she says “I represented America in the nightclub scene, and Africa in the jungle scenes.” She met Buddy Bradley in London and began teaching alongside him. She got married in London, but the marriage did not last long.

During World War II, she toured with the USO as a member of their first all-black unit. She traveled and did shows for the Navy, Air Force, and at different camps. She also performed for wounded veterans after the war in hospitals and did a show at Leavenworth. She was known for her dancing in more than 100 soundies in the 1940s. Here she became known as “Queen of the Soundies.”

Lee was featured on the cover of the March 1947 issue of Ebony.

She came back from Europe in 1950 and moved back to Atlanta, where she met her husband (Tony Mansfield). She played theaters and nightclubs in Atlanta again, but this time she was doing her own act. She also appeared on Broadway in multiple productions, including the 1952 revival of the musical Shuffle Along. She traveled to raise money for the show and was a part of raising between $500,000 and $600,000. The show only lasted three days, and all of that money went to nowhere. She also danced in The Hoofers and Bubbling Brown Sugar. She did choreography throughout her career including for the Soundies, though she did not receive credit for it.

In 1956, she fronted an uncredited vocal group on the rhythm and blues ballad “Dearest Dream,” cowritten by Billy Dawn Smith and released by Hull Records.

In 1960, she gave birth to her only child, a son named Michael, with Tony Mansfield.

Lee was the 2004 winner of the Flo-Bert Award which honors "outstanding figures in the field of tap dance", and a 2008 Inductee into the Tap Dance Hall of Fame.

Her last performance was in July 2018 at Symphony Space in Manhattan as part of the New York City Tap Festival. She kept creating so long because she was so curious and other people fostered that.

Lee died on February 7, 2019, at the age of 97 at a nursing home in Manhattan.
