= Sophisticated Ladies =

1981 musical revue

- Original poster
- Music: Duke Ellington
- Lyrics: Various
- Book: Donald McKayle
- Productions: 1981 Broadway

Sophisticated Ladies is a musical revue based on the music of Duke Ellington. The revue ran on Broadway in 1981–83, earning two awards and eight nominations at the 35th Tony Awards.

== Production ==
Sophisticated Ladies opened on Broadway at the Lunt-Fontanne Theatre on March 1, 1981, and closed on January 2, 1983, after 767 performances and fifteen previews. The musical was conceived by Donald McKayle, directed by Michael Smuin, and choreographed by McKayle, Smuin, Henry LeTang, Bruce Heath, and Mercedes Ellington. Scenic design was by Tony Walton, costume design by Willa Kim and lighting design was by Jennifer Tipton. The original cast included Gregory Hines, Judith Jamison, Phyllis Hyman, Hinton Battle, Gregg Burge, and Mercer Ellington. Hines' older brother Maurice joined the cast later in the run.

== Music ==
The score includes "Mood Indigo", "Take the "A" Train", "I'm Beginning to See the Light", "Hit Me With a Hot Note and Watch Me Bounce", "Perdido", "It Don't Mean a Thing (If It Ain't Got That Swing)", "I Let a Song Go Out of My Heart", "Old Man Blues", "In a Sentimental Mood", "Sophisticated Lady", "Don't Get Around Much Anymore", "Satin Doll", and "I Got It Bad and That Ain't Good", among many others.

== Critical reception ==
In his review for The New York Times, Frank Rich wrote that

[T]he new musical revue at the Lunt-Fontanne, is an Ellington celebration that just won't quit until it has won over the audience with dynamic showmanship. It's not a perfect entertainment - let's save the flaws for later - but it rides so high on affection, skill and, of course, stunning music that the lapses don't begin to spoil the fun. What's more, this is the only Broadway revue of recent vintage that operates on a truly grand scale.

== Awards and nominations ==
=== Original Broadway production ===
Year	Award	Category	Nominee	Result
1981	Tony Award	Best Musical		Nominated
1981	Tony Award	Best Performance by a Leading Actor in a Musical	Gregory Hines	Nominated
1981	Tony Award	Best Performance by a Featured Actor in a Musical	Hinton Battle	Won
1981	Tony Award	Best Performance by a Featured Actress in a Musical	Phyllis Hyman	Nominated
1981	Tony Award	Best Direction of a Musical	Michael Smuin	Nominated
1981	Tony Award	Best Choreography	Henry LeTang, Donald McKayle and Michael Smuin	Nominated
1981	Tony Award	Best Costume Design	Willa Kim	Won
1981	Tony Award	Best Lighting Design	Jennifer Tipton	Nominated
1981	Drama Desk Award	Outstanding Featured Actor in a Musical	Gregg Burge	Nominated
1981	Theatre World Award		Phyllis Hyman	Won
