= The Red Sneakers =

2002 American television film

- DVD cover
- Screenplay by: Mark Saltzman
- Story by: Jeffrey Rubin
- Directed by: Gregory Hines
- Starring: Vanessa Bell Calloway; Dempsey Pappion; Ruben Santiago-Hudson
- Composer: Stanley Clarke
- Country of origin: United States
- Original language: English

Production
- Producers: Tommy Lynch; Gary L. Stephenson
- Cinematography: John Berrie
- Editor: Tim King
- Running time: 109 minutes
- Production company: Dufferin Gate Productions

Original release
- Network: Showtime
- Release: February 10, 2002

The Red Sneakers is a 2002 American fantasy comedy-drama television film produced and directed by Gregory Hines. The film stars Vanessa Bell Calloway, Dempsey Pappion and Ruben Santiago-Hudson. It premiered on Showtime on February 10, 2002.

== Premise ==
This coming-of-age story features a modest high school basketball player, Reggie Reynolds, who is given a pair of magical basketball shoes by a stranger, Zeke. Reggie quickly becomes a superstar shooter on his team. He is recruited by college basketball scouts and plans his future in college basketball, as he neglects potential academic scholarship possibilities.

== Cast ==
- Vanessa Bell Calloway as Berniece
- Dempsey Pappion as Reggie
- Ruben Santiago-Hudson as Uncle Joe
- Scott Thompson as Aldo
- Philip Akin as Mr. Seabrooke
- K. C. Collins as Roscoe
- Kendra FitzRandolph as Courtney
- Cabral Richards as Khalil
- Vincent D'Onofrio as Mercado
- Gregory Hines as Zeke
- Sarah Barrable-Tishauer as Larosa
- Jordan Walker as Noah Greggory
- Drew Nelson as Jacob
- Neil Crone as Coach Blake
- Reuben Thompson as Alvin Duke
- Jake Goldsbie as Boy

== Broadcast ==
The film was first aired on Showtime Networks on February 10, 2002.

== Awards ==
Nominations

- Emmy Award – Outstanding Directing in a Children's Special – Gregory Hines – 2003
- Emmy Award – Outstanding Performer in a Children's Special – Gregory Hines – 2003
- Writers Guild of America – WGA Award (Television) – Children's Script – Mark Saltzman (teleplay) and Jeffrey Rubin (story)
- Young Artist Awards – Best Family Television Movie – Leading Young Actor – Jake Goldsbie – 2003

== Screenings ==
- Chicago International Children's Film Festival – 2002

== Reception ==
In his review for The New York Times, Laurel Graeber stated that the main character that "mathematical skill can be a real asset in basketball and that he might do better to rely on his natural gift rather than on the artificial glory of the shoes."

The Christian Science Monitor found that "the real issue for Hines is that too many kids dream about a life in sports and don't nurture their real strengths." Sun Sentinel describes the film as being "sort of the family-film flip side to Michael Powell's 1948 masterpiece The Red Shoes."

Sara Long, with the faith-based Dove Foundation gave the film a positive review, writing, "The Red Sneakers is an enjoyable movie based around inner desires, and what one knows is right as far as actions go ... Then the movie turns around to focus on the inner battle over how to behave against what one wants, and what one should do. Though this movie does have several instances of profanity, it is nothing too severe. Because the overall content is well displayed, the film is approved for ages 12 and up.

== See also ==
- List of basketball films
