= Music Is =

1976 musical by George Abbott, Richard Adler, and Will Holt

- Music: Richard Adler
- Lyrics: Will Holt
- Book: George Abbott
- Basis: Twelfth Night by William Shakespeare
- Productions: 1976 Seattle Repertory Theatre; 1976 Broadway

Music Is is a musical with a book by George Abbott, music by Richard Adler, and lyrics by Will Holt. It is the second musical adaptation of the William Shakespeare play Twelfth Night, following Your Own Thing in 1968.

== Overview ==
The plot focuses on mistaken identity. Masquerading as a young page named Cesario, Viola enters the service of Duke Orsino, who is in love with Olivia. When she rejects his romantic advances, Orsino decides to use Cesario as an intermediary. Olivia, believing Cesario to be a man, falls in love with the attractive messenger. Viola, in turn, falls in love with the Duke, who also believes Cesario is a man and regards him as his confidant.

== Productions ==
The musical had its world premiere at the Seattle Repertory Theatre in 1976. The Broadway production, directed by Abbott and choreographed by Patricia Birch, opened at the St. James Theatre on December 20, 1976, following 14 previews and closed on December 26 after eight performances. The music was orchestrated by Hershy Kay, and Paul Gemignani served as musical director.

The cast included Catherine Cox as Viola, Christopher Hewett as Malvolio, Joel Higgins as Sebastian, David Holliday as Duke Orsino, Sherry Mathis as Olivia, Joe Ponazecki as Sir Andrew Aguecheek, David Sabin as Sir Toby Belch, Daniel Ben-Zali in the dual roles of William Shakespeare and Feste, and Dana Kyle as Court Lady.

Birch was nominated for the Tony Award for Best Choreography and the Drama Desk Award for Outstanding Choreography. Cox was nominated for the Drama Desk Award for Outstanding Actress in a Musical, and Hewitt and Ben-Zali were nominated for the Drama Desk Award for Outstanding Featured Actor in a Musical.

== Song list ==
Act 1

- Music Is — William Shakespeare and Company
- When First I Saw My Lady's Face — Duke Orsino
- Lady's Choice — Viola and Captain
- The Time Is Ripe for Loving — Company
- Should I Speak of Loving You — Viola
- Hate to Say Goodbye to You — Antonio and Sebastian
- Big Bottom Betty — Feste
- Twenty-one Chateaux — Viola, Olivia and Company
- Sudden Lilac — Olivia
- Sing Hi — Sir Toby Belch, Sir Andrew Aguecheek, Feste and Maria

Act 2

- The Tennis Song — Duke Orsino, Valentine and Company
- I Am It — Malvolio
- No Matter Where — Olivia and Viola
- The Duel — Sir Toby Belch, Sir Andrew Aguecheek, Viola and Feste
- Please Be Human — Olivia and Sebastian
- What You Will — William Shakespeare and Company
