= Omari Wiles =

American choreographer

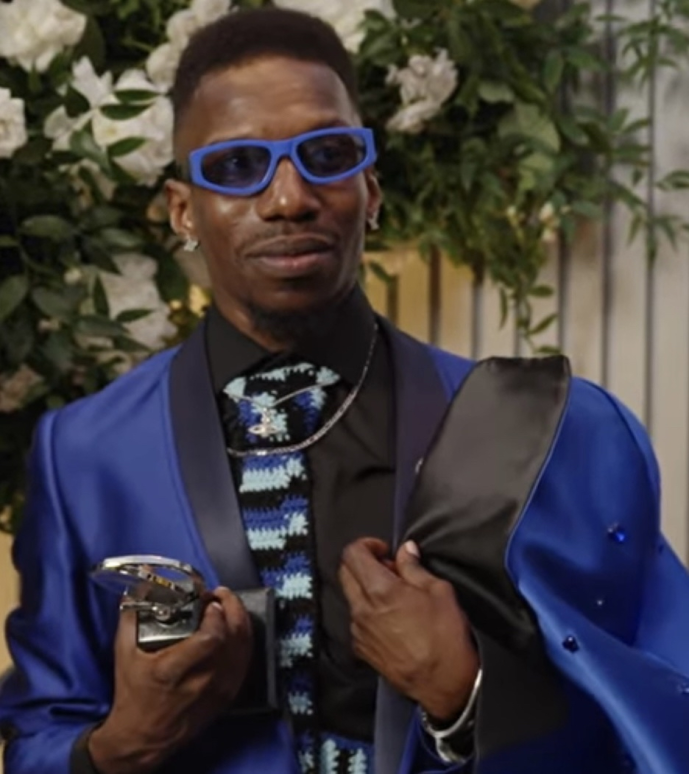
- Wiles in 2026
- Occupation: Choreographer

Omari Wiles is an American choreographer. He won a Tony Award in the category Best Choreography for the musical Cats: The Jellicle Ball. His win was shared with Arturo Lyons.
