= Delilah Jackson =

Delilah Jackson (circa 1929 - January 12, 2013) was a cultural historian who specialized in collecting the history of black entertainers in Harlem.

== Biography ==
Jackson grew up close to the Apollo Theater in Harlem. She attended school at P.S. 157.

Jackson began to collect the cultural history of Harlem and black entertainers in 1975. She began her collection with recording oral histories of various women who had worked as chorus girls at the Cotton Club. Later, that same year, she created the Black Patti Project which brought programming to former entertainers who were now living in nursing homes. The project went on to work toward collecting oral histories from black artists. Not only was Jackson known for preserving history, she often befriended the artists she met and visited them in nursing homes as they grew older. Her collection of history helped create a historical context for the artists and their work, according to the New York Amsterdam News. Over time, she amassed more 1,000 pieces of media that documented the work of black entertainers in Harlem.

Jackson curated a show at the Smithsonian in 1997 called "Paris, the Jazz Age." Jackson also lectured about entertainers from Harlem at Columbia University, the New School, the Schomburg Center and at the Smithsonian.

She was awarded the 2001 Flo-Bert Lifetime Achievement Award from the New York Committee to Celebrate Tap Dance Day. In 2005, Jackson received the Tap Preservation Award from the American Tap Dance Foundation.

Jackson died in her home on January 12, 2013.
