= Tony Award for Best Choreography =

American Broadway theatre award

- Awarded for: Best Choreography
- Location: United States New York City
- Presented by: American Theatre Wing The Broadway League
- Currently held by: Omari Wiles and Arturo Lyons for Cats: The Jellicle Ball (2026)
- Website: TonyAwards.com

The Tony Award for Best Choreography is awarded to acknowledge the contributions of choreographers in both musicals and plays. The award has been given since 1947, but nominees were not announced until 1956.

== Winners and nominees ==
indicates the winner

=== 1940s ===
| Year | Production | Choreographer |
|---|---|---|
1947 (1st)
| 1947 (1st) | Brigadoon | Agnes de Mille |
| 1947 (1st) | Finian's Rainbow | Michael Kidd |
1948 (2nd)
| 1948 (2nd) | High Button Shoes | Jerome Robbins |
1949 (3rd)
| 1949 (3rd) | Lend an Ear | Gower Champion |

=== 1950s ===
| Year | Production | Choreographer |
|---|---|---|
1950 (4th)
| 1950 (4th) | Touch and Go | Helen Tamiris |
1951 (5th)
| 1951 (5th) | Guys and Dolls | Michael Kidd |
1952 (6th)
| 1952 (6th) | Pal Joey | Robert Alton |
1953 (7th)
| 1953 (7th) | Wonderful Town | Donald Saddler |
1954 (8th)
| 1954 (8th) | Can-Can | Michael Kidd |
1955 (9th)
| 1955 (9th) | The Pajama Game | Bob Fosse |
1956 (10th)
| 1956 (10th) | Damn Yankees | Bob Fosse |
| 1956 (10th) | Phoenix '55 | Boris Runanin |
| 1956 (10th) | Pipe Dream | Boris Runanin |
| 1956 (10th) | Red Roses for Me | Anna Sokolow |
| 1956 (10th) | The Vamp | Robert Alton |
1957 (11th)
| 1957 (11th) | Li'l Abner | Michael Kidd |
| 1957 (11th) | Bells Are Ringing | Bob Fosse and Jerome Robbins |
| 1957 (11th) | The Most Happy Fella | Dania Krupska |
| 1957 (11th) | My Fair Lady | Hanya Holm |
1958 (12th)
| 1958 (12th) | West Side Story | Jerome Robbins |
| 1958 (12th) | The Music Man | Onna White |
| 1958 (12th) | New Girl in Town | Bob Fosse |
1959 (13th)
| 1959 (13th) | Redhead | Bob Fosse |
| 1959 (13th) | Flower Drum Song | Carol Haney |
| 1959 (13th) | Goldilocks | Agnes de Mille |
| 1959 (13th) | Whoop-Up | Onna White |

=== 1960s ===
| Year | Production | Choreographer |
|---|---|---|
1960 (14th)
| 1960 (14th) | Destry Rides Again | Michael Kidd |
| 1960 (14th) | Fiorello! | Peter Gennaro |
| 1960 (14th) | Greenwillow | Joe Layton |
| 1960 (14th) | Happy Town | Lee Scot |
| 1960 (14th) | Take Me Along | Onna White |
1961 (15th)
| 1961 (15th) | Bye Bye Birdie | Gower Champion |
| 1961 (15th) | Irma La Douce | Onna White |
1962 (16th)
| 1962 (16th) | Kwamina (TIE) | Agnes de Mille |
| 1962 (16th) | No Strings (TIE) | Joe Layton |
| 1962 (16th) | The Happiest Girl in the World | Dania Krupska |
| 1962 (16th) | Subways Are for Sleeping | Michael Kidd |
1963 (17th)
| 1963 (17th) | Little Me | Bob Fosse |
| 1963 (17th) | Bravo Giovanni | Carol Haney |
1964 (18th)
| 1964 (18th) | Hello, Dolly! | Gower Champion |
| 1964 (18th) | Anyone Can Whistle | Herbert Ross |
| 1964 (18th) | Funny Girl | Carol Haney |
| 1964 (18th) | High Spirits | Danny Daniels |
1965 (19th)
| 1965 (19th) | Fiddler on the Roof | Jerome Robbins |
| 1965 (19th) | Bajour | Peter Gennaro |
| 1965 (19th) | Golden Boy | Donald McKayle |
| 1965 (19th) | Half a Sixpence | Onna White |
1966 (20th)
| 1966 (20th) | Sweet Charity | Bob Fosse |
| 1966 (20th) | Mame | Onna White |
| 1966 (20th) | Man of La Mancha | Jack Cole |
| 1966 (20th) | Skyscraper | Michael Kidd |
1967 (21st)
| 1967 (21st) | Cabaret | Ron Field |
| 1967 (21st) | Annie Get Your Gun | Danny Daniels |
| 1967 (21st) | The Apple Tree | Lee Theodore |
| 1967 (21st) | A Joyful Noise | Michael Bennett |
| 1967 (21st) | Walking Happy | Danny Daniels |
1968 (22nd)
| 1968 (22nd) | The Happy Time | Gower Champion |
| 1968 (22nd) | Hallelujah, Baby! | Kevin Carlisle |
| 1968 (22nd) | Henry, Sweet Henry | Michael Bennett |
| 1968 (22nd) | Illya Darling | Onna White |
1969 (23rd)
| 1969 (23rd) | George M! | Joe Layton |
| 1969 (23rd) | Canterbury Tales | Sammy Bayes |
| 1969 (23rd) | Promises, Promises | Michael Bennett |
| 1969 (23rd) | Zorba | Ron Field |

=== 1970s ===
| Year | Production | Choreographer |
|---|---|---|
1970 (24th)
| 1970 (24th) | Applause | Ron Field |
| 1970 (24th) | Billy | Grover Dale |
| 1970 (24th) | Coco | Michael Bennett |
| 1970 (24th) | Purlie | Louis Johnson |
1971 (25th)
| 1971 (25th) | No, No, Nanette | Donald Saddler |
| 1971 (25th) | Company | Michael Bennett |
| 1971 (25th) | The Rothschilds | Michael Kidd |
1972 (26th)
| 1972 (26th) | Follies | Michael Bennett |
| 1972 (26th) | Grease | Patricia Birch |
| 1972 (26th) | Two Gentlemen of Verona | Jean Erdman |
1973 (27th)
| 1973 (27th) | Pippin | Bob Fosse |
| 1973 (27th) | Irene | Peter Gennaro |
| 1973 (27th) | Much Ado About Nothing | Donald Saddler |
| 1973 (27th) | Sugar | Gower Champion |
1974 (28th)
| 1974 (28th) | Seesaw | Michael Bennett |
| 1974 (28th) | Over Here! | Patricia Birch |
| 1974 (28th) | Raisin | Donald McKayle |
1975 (29th)
| 1975 (29th) | The Wiz | George Faison |
| 1975 (29th) | Dance with Me | Joel Zwick |
| 1975 (29th) | Doctor Jazz | Donald McKayle |
| 1975 (29th) | Mack and Mabel | Gower Champion |
| 1975 (29th) | Shenandoah | Robert Tucker |
| 1975 (29th) | Where's Charley? | Margo Sappington |
1976 (30th)
| 1976 (30th) | A Chorus Line | Bob Avian and Michael Bennett |
| 1976 (30th) | Bubbling Brown Sugar | Billy Wilson |
| 1976 (30th) | Chicago | Bob Fosse |
| 1976 (30th) | Pacific Overtures | Patricia Birch |
1977 (31st)
| 1977 (31st) | Annie | Peter Gennaro |
| 1977 (31st) | I Love My Wife | Onna White |
| 1977 (31st) | Music Is | Patricia Birch |
| 1977 (31st) | Your Arms Too Short to Box with God | Talley Beatty |
1978 (32nd)
| 1978 (32nd) | Dancin' | Bob Fosse |
| 1978 (32nd) | The Act | Ron Lewis |
| 1978 (32nd) | Ain't Misbehavin' | Arthur Faria |
| 1978 (32nd) | Runaways | Elizabeth Swados |
1979 (33rd)
| 1979 (33rd) | Ballroom | Bob Avian and Michael Bennett |
| 1979 (33rd) | The Best Little Whorehouse in Texas | Tommy Tune |
| 1979 (33rd) | Eubie! | Henry LeTang and Billy Wilson |
| 1979 (33rd) | Whoopee! | Dan Siretta |

=== 1980s ===
| Year | Production | Choreographer |
|---|---|---|
1980 (34th)
| 1980 (34th) | A Day in Hollywood / A Night in the Ukraine | Tommy Tune and Thommie Walsh |
| 1980 (34th) | Barnum | Joe Layton |
| 1980 (34th) | Evita | Larry Fuller |
| 1980 (34th) | Sugar Babies | Ernie Flatt |
1981 (35th)
| 1981 (35th) | 42nd Street | Gower Champion |
| 1981 (35th) | Can-Can | Roland Petit |
| 1981 (35th) | The Pirates of Penzance | Graciela Daniele |
| 1981 (35th) | Sophisticated Ladies | Henry LeTang, Donald McKayle and Michael Smuin |
1982 (36th)
| 1982 (36th) | Dreamgirls | Michael Bennett and Michael Peters |
| 1982 (36th) | Joseph and the Amazing Technicolor Dreamcoat | Tony Tanner |
| 1982 (36th) | Little Me | Peter Gennaro |
| 1982 (36th) | Nine | Tommy Tune |
1983 (37th)
| 1983 (37th) | My One and Only | Tommy Tune and Thommie Walsh |
| 1983 (37th) | Cats | Gillian Lynne |
| 1983 (37th) | On Your Toes | Donald Saddler |
| 1983 (37th) | Porgy and Bess | George Faison |
1984 (38th)
| 1984 (38th) | The Tap Dance Kid | Danny Daniels |
| 1984 (38th) | Baby | Wayne Cilento |
| 1984 (38th) | La Cage aux Folles | Scott Salmon |
| 1984 (38th) | The Rink | Graciela Daniele |
| 1985 (39th) | —N/a (Note: The category was not given due to an insufficient number of musicals during the season.) | |
1986 (40th)
| 1986 (40th) | Big Deal | Bob Fosse |
| 1986 (40th) | The Mystery of Edwin Drood | Graciela Daniele |
| 1986 (40th) | Song and Dance | Peter Martins |
| 1986 (40th) | Tango Argentino | Tango Argentino Dancers |
1987 (41st)
| 1987 (41st) | Me and My Girl | Gillian Gregory |
| 1987 (41st) | The Mikado | Brian Macdonald |
| 1987 (41st) | Rags | Ron Field |
| 1987 (41st) | Starlight Express | Arlene Phillips |
1988 (42nd)
| 1988 (42nd) | Anything Goes | Michael Smuin |
| 1988 (42nd) | Into the Woods | Lar Lubovitch |
| 1988 (42nd) | The Phantom of the Opera | Gillian Lynne |
| 1988 (42nd) | Sarafina! | Ndaba Mhlongo and Mbongeni Ngema |
1989 (43rd)
| 1989 (43rd) | Black and Blue | Cholly Atkins, Henry LeTang, Frankie Manning and Fayard Nicholas |
| 1989 (43rd) | Largely New York | Bill Irwin and Kimi Okada |
| 1989 (43rd) | Legs Diamond | Alan Johnson |
| 1989 (43rd) | Starmites | Michele Assaf |

=== 1990s ===
| Year | Production | Choreographer |
|---|---|---|
1990 (44th)
| 1990 (44th) | Grand Hotel | Tommy Tune |
| 1990 (44th) | Dangerous Games | Graciela Daniele and Tina Paul |
| 1990 (44th) | Meet Me in St. Louis | Joan Brickhill |
1991 (45th)
| 1991 (45th) | The Will Rogers Follies | Tommy Tune |
| 1991 (45th) | Miss Saigon | Bob Avian |
| 1991 (45th) | Oh, Kay! | Dan Siretta |
| 1991 (45th) | Once on This Island | Graciela Daniele |
1992 (46th)
| 1992 (46th) | Crazy for You | Susan Stroman |
| 1992 (46th) | Dancing at Lughnasa | Terry John Bates |
| 1992 (46th) | Guys and Dolls | Christopher Chadman |
| 1992 (46th) | Jelly's Last Jam | Hope Clarke, Gregory Hines and Ted L. Levy |
1993 (47th)
| 1993 (47th) | The Who's Tommy | Wayne Cilento |
| 1993 (47th) | Ain't Broadway Grand | Randy Skinner |
| 1993 (47th) | The Goodbye Girl | Graciela Daniele |
| 1993 (47th) | Kiss of the Spider Woman | Rob Marshall and Vincent Paterson |
1994 (48th)
| 1994 (48th) | Carousel | Kenneth MacMillan |
| 1994 (48th) | Damn Yankees | Rob Marshall |
| 1994 (48th) | Grease | Jeff Calhoun |
| 1994 (48th) | She Loves Me | Rob Marshall |
1995 (49th)
| 1995 (49th) | Show Boat | Susan Stroman |
| 1995 (49th) | How to Succeed in Business Without Really Trying | Wayne Cilento |
| 1995 (49th) | Smokey Joe's Cafe | Joey McKneely |
| 1995 (49th) | Sunset Boulevard | Bob Avian |
1996 (50th)
| 1996 (50th) | Bring in 'da Noise, Bring in 'da Funk | Savion Glover |
| 1996 (50th) | Big: the musical | Susan Stroman |
| 1996 (50th) | Chronicle of a Death Foretold | Graciela Daniele |
| 1996 (50th) | Rent | Marlies Yearby |
1997 (51st)
| 1997 (51st) | Chicago | Ann Reinking |
| 1997 (51st) | Dream | Wayne Cilento |
| 1997 (51st) | The Life | Joey McKneely |
| 1997 (51st) | Steel Pier | Susan Stroman |
1998 (52nd)
| 1998 (52nd) | The Lion King | Garth Fagan |
| 1998 (52nd) | Cabaret | Rob Marshall |
| 1998 (52nd) | Forever Tango | Forever Tango Dancers |
| 1998 (52nd) | Ragtime | Graciela Daniele |
1999 (53rd)
| 1999 (53rd) | Swan Lake | Matthew Bourne |
| 1999 (53rd) | Footloose | A. C. Ciulla |
| 1999 (53rd) | Little Me | Rob Marshall |
| 1999 (53rd) | Parade | Patricia Birch |

=== 2000s ===
| Year | Production | Choreographer |
|---|---|---|
2000 (54th)
| 2000 (54th) | Contact | Susan Stroman |
| 2000 (54th) | Kiss Me, Kate | Kathleen Marshall |
| 2000 (54th) | The Music Man | Susan Stroman |
| 2000 (54th) | Swing! | Lynne Taylor-Corbett |
2001 (55th)
| 2001 (55th) | The Producers | Susan Stroman |
| 2001 (55th) | Blast! | Jim Moore, George Pinney and Jonathan Vanderkolff |
| 2001 (55th) | 42nd Street | Randy Skinner |
| 2001 (55th) | The Full Monty | Jerry Mitchell |
2002 (56th)
| 2002 (56th) | Thoroughly Modern Millie | Rob Ashford |
| 2002 (56th) | Into the Woods | John Carrafa |
| 2002 (56th) | Oklahoma! | Susan Stroman |
| 2002 (56th) | Urinetown | John Carrafa |
2003 (57th)
| 2003 (57th) | Movin' Out | Twyla Tharp |
| 2003 (57th) | Flower Drum Song | Robert Longbottom |
| 2003 (57th) | Hairspray | Jerry Mitchell |
| 2003 (57th) | Urban Cowboy | Melinda Roy |
2004 (58th)
| 2004 (58th) | Wonderful Town | Kathleen Marshall |
| 2004 (58th) | Bombay Dreams | Farah Khan and Anthony Van Laast |
| 2004 (58th) | Never Gonna Dance | Jerry Mitchell |
| 2004 (58th) | Wicked | Wayne Cilento |
2005 (59th)
| 2005 (59th) | La Cage aux Folles | Jerry Mitchell |
| 2005 (59th) | Dirty Rotten Scoundrels | Jerry Mitchell |
| 2005 (59th) | Monty Python's Spamalot | Casey Nicholaw |
| 2005 (59th) | Sweet Charity | Wayne Cilento |
2006 (60th)
| 2006 (60th) | The Pajama Game | Kathleen Marshall |
| 2006 (60th) | The Color Purple | Donald Bryd |
| 2006 (60th) | The Drowsy Chaperone | Casey Nicholaw |
| 2006 (60th) | The Wedding Singer | Rob Ashford |
2007 (61st)
| 2007 (61st) | Spring Awakening | Bill T. Jones |
| 2007 (61st) | Curtains | Rob Ashford |
| 2007 (61st) | Legally Blonde The Musical | Jerry Mitchell |
| 2007 (61st) | Mary Poppins | Matthew Bourne and Stephen Mear |
2008 (62nd)
| 2008 (62nd) | In the Heights | Andy Blankenbuehler |
| 2008 (62nd) | Cry-Baby | Rob Ashford |
| 2008 (62nd) | Rodgers & Hammerstein's South Pacific | Christopher Gattelli |
| 2008 (62nd) | Xanadu | Dan Knechtges |
2009 (63rd)
| 2009 (63rd) | Billy Elliot the Musical | Peter Darling |
| 2009 (63rd) | Hair | Karole Armitage |
| 2009 (63rd) | 9 to 5 | Andy Blankenbuehler |
| 2009 (63rd) | White Christmas | Randy Skinner |

=== 2010s ===
| Year | Production | Choreographer |
|---|---|---|
2010 (64th)
| 2010 (64th) | Fela! | Bill T. Jones |
| 2010 (64th) | Come Fly Away | Twyla Tharp |
| 2010 (64th) | La Cage aux Folles | Lynne Page |
| 2010 (64th) | Promises, Promises | Rob Ashford |
2011 (65th)
| 2011 (65th) | Anything Goes | Kathleen Marshall |
| 2011 (65th) | The Book of Mormon | Casey Nicholaw |
| 2011 (65th) | How to Succeed in Business Without Really Trying | Rob Ashford |
| 2011 (65th) | The Scottsboro Boys | Susan Stroman |
2012 (66th)
| 2012 (66th) | Newsies | Christopher Gattelli |
| 2012 (66th) | Evita | Rob Ashford |
| 2012 (66th) | Nice Work If You Can Get It | Kathleen Marshall |
| 2012 (66th) | Once | Steven Hoggett |
2013 (67th)
| 2013 (67th) | Kinky Boots | Jerry Mitchell |
| 2013 (67th) | Bring It On | Andy Blankenbuehler |
| 2013 (67th) | Matilda the Musical | Peter Darling |
| 2013 (67th) | Pippin | Chet Walker |
2014 (68th)
| 2014 (68th) | After Midnight | Warren Carlyle |
| 2014 (68th) | Aladdin | Casey Nicholaw |
| 2014 (68th) | Bullets Over Broadway | Susan Stroman |
| 2014 (68th) | Rocky the Musical | Kelly Devine and Steven Hoggett |
2015 (69th)
| 2015 (69th) | An American in Paris | Christopher Wheeldon |
| 2015 (69th) | The Curious Incident of the Dog in the Night-Time | Scott Graham and Steven Hoggett |
| 2015 (69th) | The King and I | Christopher Gattelli |
| 2015 (69th) | On the Town | Joshua Bergasse |
| 2015 (69th) | Something Rotten! | Casey Nicholaw |
2016 (70th)
| 2016 (70th) | Hamilton | Andy Blankenbuehler |
| 2016 (70th) | Dames at Sea | Randy Skinner |
| 2016 (70th) | Fiddler on the Roof | Hofesh Shechter |
| 2016 (70th) | On Your Feet! | Sergio Trujillo |
| 2016 (70th) | Shuffle Along, or, the Making of the Musical Sensation of 1921 and All That Followed | Savion Glover |
2017 (71st)
| 2017 (71st) | Bandstand | Andy Blankenbuehler |
| 2017 (71st) | Come from Away | Kelly Devine |
| 2017 (71st) | Groundhog Day | Peter Darling and Ellen Kane |
| 2017 (71st) | Holiday Inn | Denis Jones |
| 2017 (71st) | Natasha, Pierre & The Great Comet of 1812 | Sam Pinkleton |
2018 (72nd)
| 2018 (72nd) | Carousel | Justin Peck |
| 2018 (72nd) | Harry Potter and the Cursed Child | Steven Hoggett |
| 2018 (72nd) | Mean Girls | Casey Nicholaw |
| 2018 (72nd) | My Fair Lady | Christopher Gattelli |
| 2018 (72nd) | SpongeBob SquarePants | Christopher Gattelli |
2019 (73rd)
| 2019 (73rd) | Ain’t Too Proud | Sergio Trujillo |
| 2019 (73rd) | Choir Boy | Camille A. Brown |
| 2019 (73rd) | Hadestown | David Neumann |
| 2019 (73rd) | Kiss Me, Kate | Warren Carlyle |
| 2019 (73rd) | Tootsie | Denis Jones |

=== 2020s ===
| Year | Production | Choreographer |
|---|---|---|
2020 (74th)
| 2020 (74th) | Moulin Rouge! The Musical | Sonya Tayeh |
| 2020 (74th) | Jagged Little Pill | Sidi Larbi Cherkaoui |
| 2020 (74th) | Tina: The Tina Turner Musical | Anthony Van Laast |
2022 (75th)
| 2022 (75th) | MJ | Christopher Wheeldon |
| 2022 (75th) | for colored girls who have considered suicide / when the rainbow is enuf | Camille A. Brown |
| 2022 (75th) | The Music Man | Warren Carlyle |
| 2022 (75th) | Paradise Square | Bill T. Jones |
| 2022 (75th) | SIX: The Musical | Carrie-Anne Ingrouille |
2023 (76th)
| 2023 (76th) | Some Like It Hot | Casey Nicholaw |
| 2023 (76th) | & Juliet | Jennifer Weber |
| 2023 (76th) | KPOP | Jennifer Weber |
| 2023 (76th) | New York, New York | Susan Stroman |
| 2023 (76th) | Sweeney Todd: The Demon Barber of Fleet Street | Steven Hoggett |
2024 (77th)
| 2024 (77th) | Illinoise | Justin Peck |
| 2024 (77th) | Hell's Kitchen | Camille A. Brown |
| 2024 (77th) | Here Lies Love | Annie-B Parson |
| 2024 (77th) | The Outsiders | Jeff Kuperman and Rick Kuperman |
| 2024 (77th) | Water for Elephants | Shana Carroll and Jesse Robb |
2025 (78th)
| 2025 (78th) | Buena Vista Social Club | Patricia Delgado and Justin Peck |
| 2025 (78th) | BOOP! The Musical | Jerry Mitchell |
| 2025 (78th) | Death Becomes Her | Christopher Gattelli |
| 2025 (78th) | Gypsy | Camille A. Brown |
| 2025 (78th) | Smash | Joshua Bergasse |
2026 (79th)
| 2026 (79th) | Cats: The Jellicle Ball | Omari Wiles and Arturo Lyons |
| 2026 (79th) | The Lost Boys | Lauren Yalango-Grant and Christopher Cree Grant |
| 2026 (79th) | Ragtime | Ellenore Scott |
| 2026 (79th) | The Rocky Horror Show | Ani Taj |
| 2026 (79th) | Schmigadoon! | Christopher Gattelli |

== Multiple wins ==
8 Wins

- Bob Fosse

5 Wins

- Michael Bennett
- Gower Champion
- Michael Kidd

4 Wins

- Susan Stroman
- Tommy Tune

3 Wins

- Andy Blankenbuehler
- Kathleen Marshall
- Jerome Robbins
- Justin Peck

2 Wins

- Bob Avian
- Agnes de Mille
- Ron Field
- Bill T. Jones
- Joe Layton
- Jerry Mitchell
- Donald Saddler
- Christopher Wheeldon

== Multiple nominations ==
11 nominations

- Bob Fosse
- Susan Stroman

10 nominations

- Michael Bennett

8 nominations

- Graciela Daniele
- Michael Kidd
- Jerry Mitchell
- Onna White

7 nominations

- Rob Ashford
- Gower Champion
- Christopher Gattelli
- Casey Nicholaw

6 nominations

- Wayne Cilento
- Tommy Tune

5 nominations

- Patricia Birch
- Andy Blankenbuehler
- Peter Gennaro
- Kathleen Marshall
- Rob Marshall

4 nominations

- Bob Avian
- Camille A. Brown
- Ron Field
- Steven Hoggett
- Joe Layton
- Donald McKayle
- Jerome Robbins
- Donald Saddler
- Randy Skinner

3 nominations

- Warren Carlyle
- Danny Daniels
- Peter Darling
- Agnes de Mille
- Carol Haney
- Bill T. Jones
- Henry LeTang
- Justin Peck

2 nominations

- Robert Alton
- Joshua Bergasse
- Matthew Bourne
- John Carrafa
- George Faison
- Savion Glover
- Denis Jones
- Dania Krupska
- Gillian Lynne
- Joey McKneely
- Dan Siretta
- Michael Smuin
- Twyla Tharp
- Sergio Trujillo
- Thommie Walsh
- Jennifer Weber
- Christopher Wheeldon
- Billy Wilson

== See also ==
- Drama Desk Award for Outstanding Choreography
- Laurence Olivier Award for Best Theatre Choreographer
- List of Tony Award-nominated productions
