= Charles Cook (dancer) =

American tap dancer (1914–1991)

Charles "Cookie" Cook (February 11, 1914 – August, 1991) was a tap dancer who performed in the heyday of tap through the 1980s, and was a founding member of the Copasetics. He was the dance partner of Ernest "Brownie" Brown, with whom he performed from the days of vaudeville into the 1960s. They performed in film, such as Dorothy Dandridge 1942 "soundie" Cow Cow Boogie, on Broadway in the 1948 musical Kiss Me, Kate, twice at the Newport Jazz Festival, as well in other acts, including "Garbage and His Two Cans" in which they played the garbage cans. He headlined venues including New York's Palace, the Apollo, Radio City Music Hall, Cotton Club, and London Palladium. Cook was one of the most influential tap masters and crucial in passing on the tap tradition to future generations.

== Early life ==
Charles Cook was born on February 11, 1914 in Chicago, Illinois, but grew up in Detroit, Michigan. He was raised by his mother, who ran a boarding house for Black performers who were not welcome at white-owned establishments. As a result, he met and saw a number of acts including Ethel Waters, Butterbeans and Susie, Runnin' Wild, and Lucky Sambo as a young child. He was 13 when he met Ernest "Brownie" Brown, who would later become his dance partner.

== Career ==
=== Early career ===
Cook began performing at a young age, and in 1929 performed with the act "Garbage and His Two Cans", playing the garbage cans, and toured Black vaudeville circuits with Sarah Venabe and Her Picks. In 1930 he formed the dance team Cook & Brown with Ernest "Brownie" Brown. This was a "knockabout" comedy act, complete with acrobatic stunts, comedy, tumbling, and dancing. It was noted to be some of the best comedy dancing during the 1930s, and they opened at the Cotton Club and performed at Lafayette Theatre. They were the second Black set to appear at Radio City Music Hall. Cook and Brown were also featured in the 1943 film "Chatter". Both Brown and Cook had to continue the tradition of "blacking up" by wearing burnt cork, though they tried to avoid the practice as much as possible.

He is quoted as saying "if you can walk, you can dance".

=== The Copasetics ===
Cook was a founding member of the Copasetics, a group of tappers and performers dedicated to preserving the memory of Bill "Bojangles" Robinson in 1949. The group was founded after Robinson's funeral, and was a fraternity of "drinking buddies". The group included Honi Coles, Buster Brown, "Bubba" Gains, "Phace" Roberts, Louis Sims Carpenter, Leroy Myers, Cook, and others. There were no membership dues, instead a hat was passed around to collect money, and if there was any extra it was given to whichever member needed it most. Cook performed often with the Copasetics, including many charitable performances, such as benefits for Associated Black Charities. The Copasetics also performed in Los Angeles at the 1984 Summer Olympic games. In 1990, Cook performed at a "Salute to the Copasetics", described as "An Evening of Terrific Tap Dancing by the Best".

=== Changing Times Tap Dancing Co ===
In the 1970s when Brown retired, Cookie continued to perform as a guest and solo artist, as well as teach. He taught at the Brooklyn Academy of Music, American University, Clark Center for the Performing Arts, and Yale, and always taught with his back to students. He taught at multiple festivals and workshops, including at the Village Gate, the By Word of Foot tap Festival, and at a Harlem School of the Arts foundation. He was "given hell" by the other members of the Copasetics for passing on tap steps to white girls, most notably Jane Goldberg.

Goldberg was Cook's mentee and dance partner for many years. He was noted to have created several dances for the two of them, to songs including "Let's be Buddies" and "The Jitterbug Waltz". In 1978-79, under the Comprehensive Employment and Training Act, which provided jobs to artists, Goldberg and Cook performed together at nursing homes, schools, libraries, and small theaters throughout New York City. At that time, it was a big deal to Cook to have steady employment and income.

In 1978, Goldberg received a choreography fellowship from the National Endowment for the Arts and created It's About Time, a lecture-demonstration that Cook was an integral part of. The lecture-demonstration ended up evolving into a full show featuring Cook and other artists, known as Goldberg's "Changing Times Tap Dancing Company". The show was incredibly well received and toured all over the United States including Cincinnati, Seattle, Washington D.C., Philadelphia, as well as performing at George Wein's Kool Jazz Festival, a festival at NYU, Harvard, and at the Merrill Lynch Dance Series at the Goodman Theatre in Chicago. Their show at the Goodman Theatre featured Cook and Goldberg as detectives solving the case of missing tap shoes from the Tap Hall of Fame, bringing tap masters on stage to discover the thief. Though Cook revived old acts for their performances, he was always creating new works and acts. The cast ranged from tap veterans to brand new tappers, and included improvisation, production numbers by cast, and a full cast finale. The company was dedicated to preserving, promoting, and performing jazz tap. One of their shows was entitled "Shoot Me While I'm Happy: An Evening of Jazz Tap Dancing", and as per tradition, they invited members of the audience on stage for the finale. "Shoot me while I'm happy" came from a line that Cookie would always shout during the third break of the shim sham. When performing with Cook, Goldberg noted that he would always freak out the night before a show, feeling as though he deserved more money and accusing Goldberg of taking more than her fair share of pay, as he was used to being ripped off by white managers.

=== Career 1960s-80s ===
Cook did some performing abroad, and was commissioned to pick singers and dancers to perform in Italy at the Cotton Club in Rome in 1962. The same year he toured in Asia, performing in China and Japan with the potential to stop in Korea although it is unclear whether or not he did end up performing there.

Throughout the 1970s and 80s, Cook had a busy and diverse career. He appeared in films including "Cotton Club" (1984), and "Great Feats of Feet", a 1977 documentary about the Copasetics funded by the National Endowment for the Arts. He choreographed "Fancy Feet" at the Smithsonian Institution, and served as assistant coordinator for "Sisters", an all female jazz performance. He appeared in "Kiss Me Kate" on Broadway, performed at the Newport Jazz Festival in "Benny Carter & The Tap Dance Greats", American Dance Festival, Delacorte Dance Festival, Apollo Theater's Rat-A-Tat-Tap Festival, and Jacob's Pillow Dance Festival. Many of these festivals also featured other Copasetics members and new tappers, such as Savion Glover. Cook also danced in Brookly Academy of Music's Tappin' Uptown: A New Tap Musical, City College's Aaron Davis Hall in An Evening with Charles Cook and Friends (1984), and at Boston Opera House in the Great Tap Dance Reunion (1988). He also danced at the Gershwin Gala, has performed at Carnegie Hall, and was the subject of "Cookie's Harlem", an exhibit about his life.

Cook has also performed at the Clark Center Summer Dance Festival in 1986 in a program called "Dancing Feet", at Lincoln Center Out of Doors in a performance called "Tap Blast" in 1989, and at the American Tap Dance Orchestra Premiere Performance at Statue of Liberty Festival in Battery Park. In 1990 he performed and was part of a lecture entitled "On Tap: Tap Dance as Living History" in Harlem.

Cook was also featured in "Black Broadway", a show that opened in 1980 celebrating Black artistry. The show featured a number of song and dance numbers including Bill Robinson's "Doin' the New Lowdown" and "Digga Digga Do" (1928), "Stormy Weather" (1933), and "Sweet Georgia Brown" (1925).

== Death and legacy ==
In 1989, he was rushed from his home on St. Nicholas Ave to St. Luke's Hospital after collapsing for an unknown reason. Cook died in early August, 1991 at the age of 77 in New York City from kidney failure. He left instructions that his ashes were to be spread in "2040 7th Avenue space".

Cook is noted as being one of the most accessible tap masters from whom younger generations learned steps. He was passionate about passing on tap routines that he wanted to preserve, despite criticism from other tappers. His students included Pat Cannon, Heather Cornell, Susan Goldbetter, Constance Valis Hill, Katherine Kramer, and many more. Gail Conrad and Jane Goldberg in particular credit Cookie with their tap skills and "finesse".

== Personal life ==
Little is known about Cook's personal life. He never married but had a close, seemingly flirtatious, relationship with his student Jane Goldberg. In addition to frequently performing around New York City, he also attended other arts events in the city. He is noted to have attended the presentation of tap shoes to the mayor Dinkins of New York City on National Tap Dance Day in 1990, and attended celebrations of Duke Ellington and Charles "Honi" Coles. There are multiple references to Cook's drinking habits, in particular his habit of drinking before shows, causing him to lose control or miss steps on stage. Cook also had been mentioned to have mood swings and emotional outbursts before shows.
