= Norman Snow =

American actor (1950–2022)

- Born: March 29, 1950; Little Rock, Arkansas, U.S.
- Died: November 28, 2022 (aged 72); Los Angeles, CA
- Education: Juilliard School (BFA)
- Occupation: Actor
- Years active: 1976–2012
- Spouse: Mary-Joan Negro

Norman Snow (March 29, 1950 – November 28, 2022) was an American character actor of stage, film and television, who is known for his role as Xur in the science fiction film The Last Starfighter (1984), among other roles.

== Early life and education ==
Born in Little Rock, Arkansas, Norman began a lifelong love of music and performance, beginning at the Second Baptist Church with singing in the children's choir. After graduating from North Little Rock High School, he was accepted into the inaugural class of the Juilliard School, and later became a founding member of John Houseman's The Acting Company.

== Career ==
Theatre

As a member of The Acting Company, Snow performed lead roles in classical plays in New York City, and on tour in American and England. As a tenor, he also sang in several choirs, including The St. Charles Borromeo Choir in North Hollywood, and Metropolitan Master Chorale in Los Angeles.

Television and film

Snow appeared in television shows and films from the late 1970s onward, in series such as Man from Atlantis (1977), and the 1979 film The Europeans.

In the 1980s he played A.D.A. John Blackwell on the soap-opera Texas (1980), D.A. Hollis Martin on Another World (1985), and Peter Devane in a 1986 episode of Spenser: For Hire.

From 1990 to 1991 he was a member of the cast of General Hospital as Broxton in more than two dozen episodes. Other 1990s series include Quantum Leap (1992), L.A. Law (1993), and Beverly Hills, 90210 (1997). A highlight of Snow's television career is the role of Torin in an episode of Star Trek: The Next Generation called "Rightful Heir" during the series' sixth season. He also appeared on Law & Order (1994), Profiler as Morgan Ballard (1997), and Days of our Lives in a recurring role as Duke Rupert Harriman (1998–2000).

His film career was more sporadic with roles ranging from The Last Starfighter in 1984, to the Atlanta Police Chief of Homicide Springfield in the 1986 Michael Mann 'Hannibal Lecter' thriller Manhunter. Snow returned to cinema screens as Jim Rock in the 2001 film Moonbeams along with his wife, Mary-Joan Negro in the role of Sr. Christina.

== Personal life ==
Norman Snow was married to actress Mary-Joan Negro, who was also a founding member of John Houseman's, The Acting Company.

== Filmography ==
Year	Title	Role	Notes
1979	The Europeans	Mr. Brand	
1981	Rollover	Hishan	
1984	The Last Starfighter	Xur	
1986	Manhunter	Springfield	
2001	Moonbeams	Dr. Phineas Ahern	
2012	Surprising Merrily	Richard Hooker	(final film role)
