= Arturo Lyons =

American choreographer

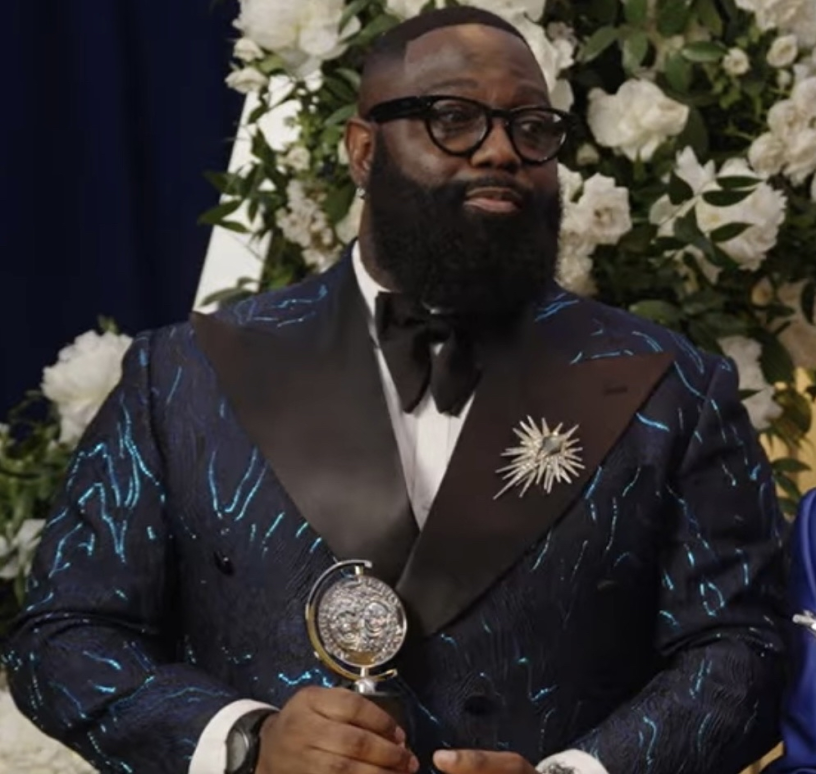
- Lyons in 2026
- Occupation: Choreographer

Arturo Lyons is an American choreographer. He won a Tony Award in the category Best Choreography for the musical Cats: The Jellicle Ball. His win was shared with Omari Wiles.
