= One Night Stand (musical) =

- Original cast recording
- Music: Jule Styne
- Lyrics: Herb Gardner
- Book: Herb Gardner
- Productions: 1980 Broadway (8 previews, never opened)

One Night Stand is a musical with a book and lyrics by Herb Gardner and music by Jule Styne. Its plot centers on a songwriter who feels he's past his prime.

Styne had approached Gardner about adapting his play A Thousand Clowns for the musical stage, but Gardner was more interested in working on an original project. According to producer Joe Kipness, the collaboration was ill-conceived, since the two men could not agree about anything.

The Broadway production, directed by John Dexter and choreographed by Peter Gennaro, began previews at the Nederlander Theatre on October 20, 1980. After eight performances, it closed without ever officially opening. The cast included Charles Kimbrough, Catherine Cox, Jack Weston, and Brandon Maggart.

A cast album was released by Original Cast Records.

== Song list ==
Act I

- Everybody Loves Me
- There Was a Time (Part I)
- A Little Travellin' Music Please
- Go Out Big
- Someday Soon
- For You
- I Am Writing a Love Song

Act II

- Gettin' Some
- Somebody Stole My Kazoo
- I Am Writing a Love Song (Reprise)
- We Used to Talk Once
- The 'Now' Dance
- Long Way From Home
- Too Old To Be So Young
- Everybody Loves Me (Reprise)
- There Was a Time (Part II)
- Here Comes Never
