= Jane Goldberg =

American tap dancer and historian

Jane Nedda Goldberg (born February 2, 1948) is an American tap dancer and historian. Jane founded the Changing Times Tap Dance Company in 1979. She is the author of "Shoot Me While I'm Happy: Memories of The Tap Goddess of the Lower East Side (2008)," an autobiographical work describing her experiences within the world of tap. Since 1977, Jane has received numerous awards for her tap dancing performances and productions, expanding the legend and lore of tap dancing into the community.

== Early life ==
Jane was born in Washington, DC

== Career ==
Jane began her career as a journalist, writing for The Boston Globe, The Patriot Ledger, The Village Voice, Dance Magazine and The New York Times, among other periodicals.

During her fifty-year history as a tap dancer and promoter, Jane interviewed, worked with and learned from many of the greats including: Honi Coles, Cookie Cook, Bubba Gaines, Bert 'Gip' Gibson, Chuck Green, Gregory Hines, Meredith Monk and others.

The year 1978 was a prolific year for shows, including Its About Time, Jacobs Pillow, Village Vanguard and Chappaqua Arts Center to name a few. During this time, she was employed as a dancer under the Cultural Council Foundation CETA Artists Project along with Charles “Cookie” Cook. CETA, the Comprehensive Employment and Training Act, which funded 20,000 arts sector jobs nationwide, provided Goldberg with a steady salary as well as performance opportunities.

== Awards ==
- National Endowment for the Arts (NEA) Fellowship in Choreography, 1977
