= Peter Gennaro =

American dancer and choreographer (1919–2000)

- Born: November 23, 1919; Metairie, Louisiana, USA
- Died: September 28, 2000 (aged 80); New York City, New York, USA
- Occupations: Choreographer, dancer
- Years active: 1948-1997
- Spouse: Jean Kinsella (m. 1948–2000)
- Awards: Drama Desk Award for Outstanding Choreography 1977 Annie; Tony Award for Best Choreography 1977 Annie

Peter Gennaro (November 23, 1919 – September 28, 2000) was an American dancer and choreographer.

== Biography ==
Gennaro was born in Metairie, Louisiana. He made his Broadway debut in the ensemble of Make Mine Manhattan in 1948. He followed this with Kiss Me, Kate (1948) and Guys and Dolls (1950). He first drew notice from theatergoers as a member of the trio that danced the Bob Fosse number "Steam Heat" in The Pajama Game (1954), and continued to hold their attention with the "Mu Cha Cha" number with Judy Holliday in Bells Are Ringing (1956). A year later, he broke out of the chorus line and into choreography when he collaborated with Jerome Robbins on West Side Story, choreographing (without credit) a majority of the "America" and "Mambo" dance sequences.

In addition to his theater chores, Gennaro worked steadily in television, appearing in or choreographing such shows as Your Hit Parade, The Andy Williams Show, The Judy Garland Show and Perry Como’s Kraft Music Hall. With his dance troupe, he was a guest on Ed Sullivan's CBS Sunday night variety show dozens of times, and was a member of the regular repertory company on the short-lived CBS variety show The Entertainers (1964–1965), which starred, among others, Ruth Buzzi, Carol Burnett, John Davidson and Bob Newhart. He also served for many years as choreographer for Radio City Music Hall, staging routines for The Rockettes.

He was inducted, posthumously, into the American Theatre Hall of Fame in 2002.

=== Personal life ===
Gennaro met his wife, Jean Kinsella, while working in Chicago, and the two married in 1948. His daughter, Liza, is also a dancer and choreographer and Dean of Musical Theatre at Manhattan School of Music. His son Michael is the Executive Director for Trinity Repertory Company and previously served as executive director of both the Steppenwolf Theatre Company and the Paper Mill Playhouse. The family lived for a time in Paramus, New Jersey, up to 1972.

Gennaro died in New York City on September 28, 2000, aged 80.

== Stage productions ==
- 1997 Annie (revival) (Choreography)
- 1989 Threepenny Opera (Musical Staging)
- 1983 Singin' in the Rain (London) (Choreography)
- 1982 Little Me (revival) (Choreography)
- 1980 West Side Story (revival) (Co-Choreography); One Night Stand (Choreography)
- 1979 Carmelina (Choreography)
- 1978 Bar Mitzvah Boy (London) (Choreography)
- 1977 Annie (Choreography)
- 1973 Irene (Choreography)
- 1969 Jimmy! (Choreography)
- 1964 Bajour (Choreography)
- 1964 West Side Story (revival) (Co-Choreographer)
- 1962 Mr. President (Choreography)
- 1960 The Unsinkable Molly Brown (Choreography)
- 1959 Fiorello! (Choreography)
- 1957 West Side Story (Co-Choreography)
- 1956 Bells Are Ringing (Performer)
- 1954 The Pajama Game (Performer)
- 1950 Guys and Dolls (Performer)
- 1950 Arms and the Girl (Performer)
- 1948 Kiss Me Kate (Performer)
- 1948 Make Mine Manhattan (Performer)

== Awards and nominations ==
Awards

- 1977 Drama Desk Award for Outstanding Choreography – Annie
- 1977 Tony Award for Best Choreography – Annie

Nominations

- 1960 Tony Award for Best Choreography – Fiorello!
- 1965 Tony Award for Best Choreography – Bajour
- 1973 Tony Award for Best Choreography – Irene
- 1982 Tony Award for Best Choreography – Little Me
- 1999 Laurence Olivier Theatre Award for Best Theatre Choreographer – Annie
