= Wings (play) =

Play written by Arthur Kopit

- Original language: English
- Written by: Arthur Kopit
- Characters: Emily Stilson; Amy; Doctors; Nurses; Billy; Mr. Brownstein; Mrs. Timmins
- Genre: Drama

Premiere
- Date: March 3, 1978
- Place: Yale Repertory Theatre; New Haven, CT

Wings is a 1978 play by American playwright Arthur Kopit. Originating as a radio play, it was later adapted for stage and screen.

In 1976, Kopit was commissioned to write an original radio play by the NPR drama project Earplay. Just prior, his father had suffered a debilitating stroke, which inspired Kopit to write the play about the language disorder and psychological perspective of a stroke victim. The female character of the play is an amalgam of two women who were both patients at the rehab center that cared for his father.

== Production history ==
The first professional stage production of Wings opened at the Yale Repertory Theatre in New Haven, Connecticut on March 3, 1978, with Constance Cummings as Emily Stilson, and Marianne Owen as Amy.

The Yale Rep Theatre cast and crew was as follows:

- Emily Stilson - Constance Cummings
- Amy - Marianne Owen
- Doctors - Geoffrey Pierson, Roy Steinberg
- Nurses - Caris Corfman, Carol Ostrow
- Billy - Richard Grusin
- Mr. Brownstein - Ira Bernstein
- Mrs. Timmins - Betty Pelzer
- Directed by John Madden
- Designed by Andrew Jackness
- Costumes by Jeanne Button
- Lighting by Tom Schraeder
- Sound by Tom Voegeli
- Music by Herb Pilhofer

Wings opened at the Off-Broadway New York Shakespeare Festival Public/ Newman Theater, presented by Joseph Papp, on June 21, 1978 for a limited run to July 2, 1978. This was the Yale Rep production with the same cast and creatives.

Wings opened on Broadway at the Lyceum Theatre on January 28, 1979 and closed on May 5, 1979 after 113 performances and 6 previews. The cast and crew was as follows:

- Emily Stilson - Constance Cummings
- Amy - Mary-Joan Negro
- Doctors - Roy Steinberg, Ross Petty
- Nurses - Gina Franz, Mary Michele Rutherfurd
- Billy - James Tolkan
- Mr. Brownstein - Carl Don
- Mrs. Timmins - Betty Pelzer
- Directed by John Madden
- Designed by Andrew Jackness
- Costumes by Jeanne Button
- Lighting by Tom Schraeder
- Sound by Tom Voegeli
- Music by Herb Pilhofer

It was filmed for U.S. television in 1983, starring Constance Cummings and Mary-Joan Negro.

== Themes ==
Richard Eder wrote in The New York Times: "Wings is a remarkable attempt to dramatize the agony of a stroke victim. It presents [a] mind whose language has been knocked out from under it; one that struggles blindly, with alternating grace and terror, to regain its footing."

Michael Billington wrote: "...this is a play about language – about Emily’s progress from a jumbled, disordered speech to one that achieves a wondrous coherence."

== Awards and recognition ==
- 1979 Drama Desk Award, Outstanding Actress in a Play, Cummings, winner
- 1979 Drama Desk Award Outstanding Director of a Play, nominee
- 1979 Drama Desk Award Outstanding New Play, nominee
- 1979 Obie Award, Performance, Cummings, winner
- 1979 Tony Award Play, nominee
- 1979 Tony Award Actress in a Play, Cummings, winner
- 1979 Tony Award Featured Actress in a Play, Mary-Joan Negro, nominee
- 1979 Selection, The Burns Mantle Theater Yearbook, The Best Plays of 1978-1979

== Adaptations ==
The play was adapted into a musical of the same name with music by Jeffrey Lunden and book and lyrics by Arthur Perlman, which premiered at Chicago's Goodman Theatre in October 1992.
