= Maxine Sullivan =

American jazz vocalist (1911–1987)

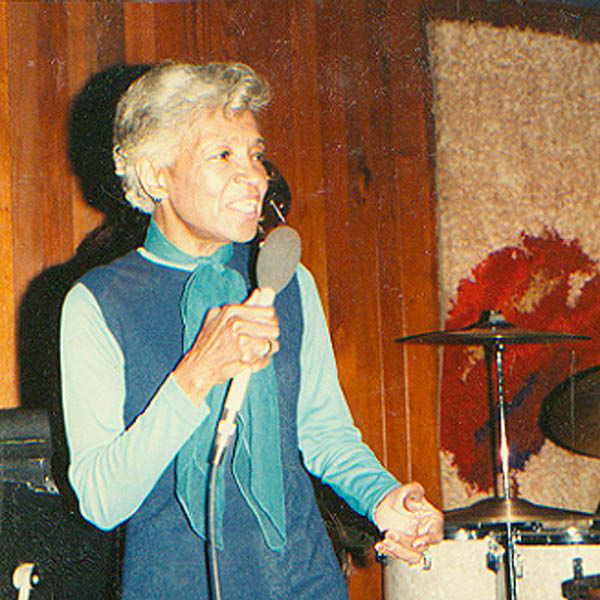
- Sullivan at the Village Jazz Lounge in Walt Disney World, 1975

Background information
- Born: Marietta Williams; May 13, 1911; Homestead, Pennsylvania, U.S.
- Died: April 7, 1987 (aged 75) New York City, U.S.
- Genres: Vocal jazz, swing
- Occupation: Singer
- Years active: 1930s–1970s
- Labels: Monmouth Evergreen, Riff, Kenneth, Stash, Atlantic, Concord

Maxine Sullivan (May 13, 1911 – April 7, 1987), born Marietta Williams in Homestead, Pennsylvania, United States, was an American jazz vocalist and performer.

As a vocalist, Sullivan was active for half a century, from the mid-1930s to just before her death in 1987. She is best known for her 1937 recording of a swing version of the Scottish folk song "Loch Lomond". Throughout her career, Sullivan also appeared as a performer on film as well as on stage. A precursor to better-known later vocalists such as Ella Fitzgerald and Sarah Vaughan, Sullivan is considered one of the best jazz vocalists of the 1930s. Singer Peggy Lee named Sullivan as a key influence in several interviews.

== Career ==
Sullivan began her music career singing in her uncle's band, The Red Hot Peppers, in her native Pennsylvania, in which she occasionally played the flugelhorn and the valve trombone, in addition to singing. In the mid 1930s, she was discovered by Gladys Mosier (then working in Ina Ray Hutton's big band). Mosier introduced her to pianist Claude Thornhill, which led to her first recordings made in June 1937. Shortly thereafter, Sullivan became a featured vocalist at the Onyx Club in New York City. During this period, she began forming a professional and close personal relationship with bassist John Kirby, who became her second husband in 1938.

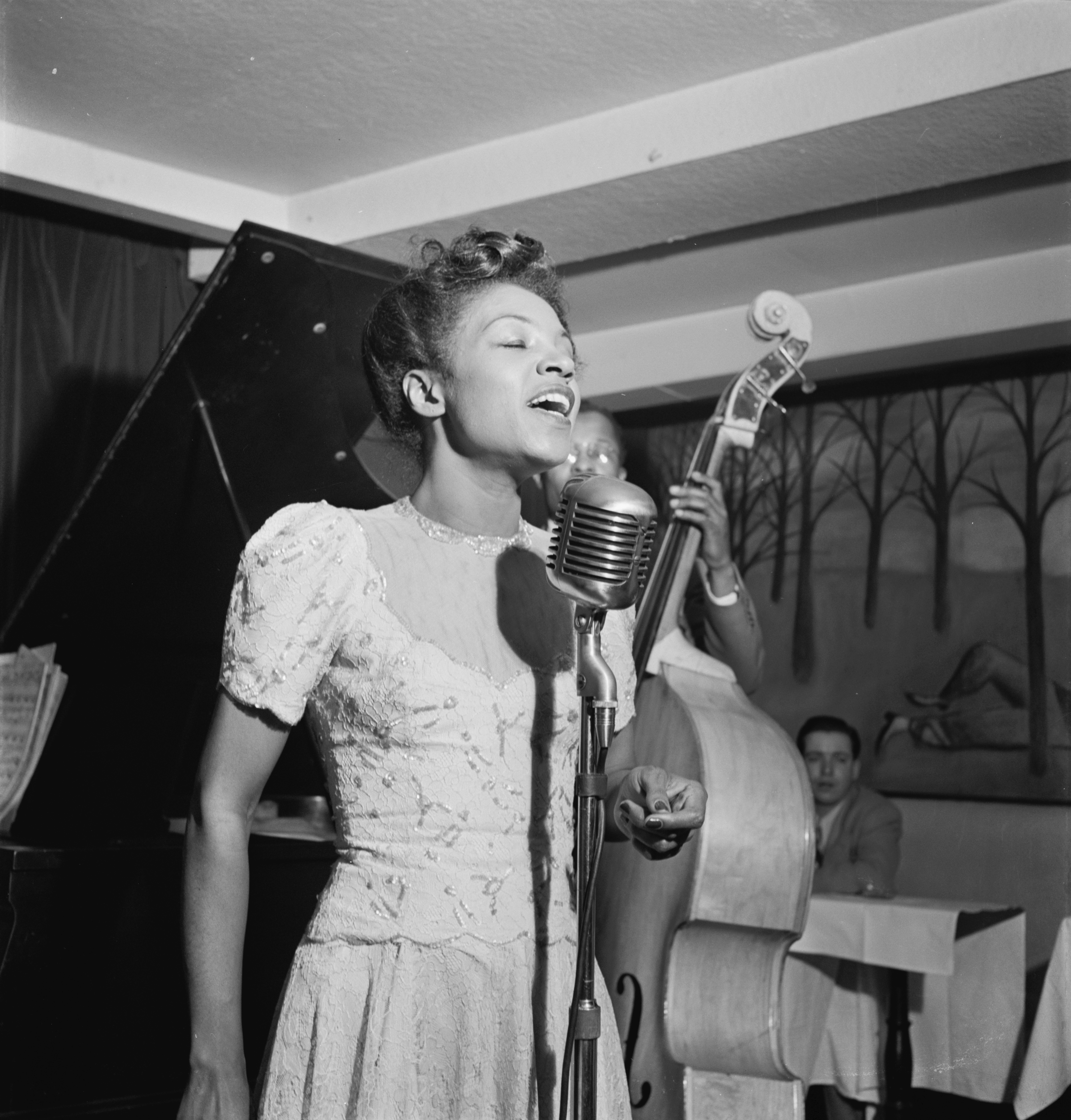
Sullivan at the Village Vanguard, New York City, in 1947

Early sessions with Kirby in 1937 yielded a hit recording of a swing version of the Scottish folk song "Loch Lomond" featuring Sullivan on vocals. This early success "branded" Sullivan's style, leading her to sing similar swing arrangements of traditional folk tunes mostly arranged by Thornhill, such as "If I Had a Ribbon Bow" and "I Dream of Jeanie". Her early popularity also led to a brief appearance in the 1938 film Going Places with Louis Armstrong.

In 1940, Sullivan and Kirby were featured on the radio program Flow Gently Sweet Rhythm, making them the first black jazz stars to have their own weekly radio series. During the 1940s, Sullivan then performed with a wide range of bands, including her husband's sextet and groups headed by Teddy Wilson, Benny Carter, and Jimmie Lunceford. Sullivan performed at many of New York's hottest jazz spots such as the Ruban Bleu, the Village Vanguard, the Blue Angel, and the Penthouse. In 1949, Sullivan appeared on the short-lived CBS Television series Uptown Jubilee, and in 1953 starred in the play, Take a Giant Step.

In 1956, Sullivan shifted from her earlier style and recorded the album A Tribute to Andy Razaf; originally on the Period record label, the album featured Sullivan's interpretations of a dozen tunes using Andy Razaf's lyrics. The album also highlighted the music of Fats Waller, including versions of "Keepin' Out of Mischief Now", "How Can You Face Me?", "My Fate Is in Your Hands", "Honeysuckle Rose", "Ain't Misbehavin'", and "Blue Turning Grey Over You". Sullivan was joined by a sextet that was reminiscent of Kirby's group fifteen years prior, including trumpeter Charlie Shavers and clarinetist Buster Bailey.

In 1958, she was one of those photographed for the iconic photograph A Great Day in Harlem.

From 1958, Sullivan worked as a nurse before resuming her musical career in 1966, performing in jazz festivals alongside her fourth husband Cliff Jackson, who can be heard on the 1966 live recording of Sullivan's performance at the Manassas Jazz Festival. Sullivan continued to perform throughout the 1970s and made a string of recordings during the 1980s, despite being over 70 years old. She was nominated for the 1979 Tony Award for Best Featured Actress in a Musical (won by Carlin Glynn) for her role in My Old Friends, and participated in the film biography Maxine Sullivan: Love to Be in Love, shortly before her death.

== Personal life ==
Sullivan married four times; her second husband was the band leader John Kirby (married 1938, divorced 1941), while her fourth husband, whom she married in 1950, was the stride pianist Cliff Jackson, who died in 1970. She had two children, Orville Williams (b. 1928) and Paula Morris (b. 1945).

== Death ==
Sullivan died aged 75 in 1987 in New York City, after suffering a seizure. She was posthumously inducted into the Big Band and Jazz Hall of Fame in 1998.

== Discography ==
- Leonard Feather Presents Maxine Sullivan 1956 (Period, 1956)
- Leonard Feather Presents Maxine Sullivan, Vol. II (Period, 1956)
- Close as Pages in a Book with Bob Wilber (Monmouth Evergreen, 1969)
- Live at the Overseas Press Club (Chiaroscuro, 1970)
- Sullivan, Shakespeare & Hyman with Dick Hyman (Monmouth Evergreen, 1971)
- We Just Couldn't Say Goodbye (Audiophile, 1978)
- Maxine Sullivan with the Ike Isaacs Quartet (Audiophile, 1981)
- The Queen Maxine Sullivan & Her Swedish Jazz All Stars (Kenneth records, 1981)
- Maxine with Ted Easton (Audiophile, 1982)
- Great Songs from the Cotton Club (Stash, 1984)
- On Tour with the Allegheny Jazz Quartet (Jump, 1984)
- Sings the Music of Burton Lane with Keith Ingham (Stash, 1985)
- Uptown with Scott Hamilton (Concord Jazz, 1985)
- Good Morning, Life! (Audiophile, 1985)
- I Love to Be in Love (Tono, 1986)
- Enjoy Yourself! (Audiophile, 1986)
- Together with Keith Ingham (Atlantic, 1987)
- Swingin' Sweet with Scott Hamilton (Concord Jazz, 1988)
- Spring Isn't Everything with Loomis McGlohon (Audiophile, 1989)
- At Vine St. Live (DRG, 1992)
- The Music of Hoagy Carmichael (Audiophile, 1993)
- 1937–1938 (Classics, 1997)
- Love...Always (Baldwin Street Music, 1997)

=== As guest ===
- Bobby Hackett, Live from Manassas (Fat Cat's Jazz,)
- World's Greatest Jazz Band of Yank Lawson and Bob Haggart, On Tour II (World Jazz, 1977)
- Charlie Shavers, The Complete Charlie Shavers with Maxine Sullivan (Bethlehem, 1957)

== Film and television credits ==
- 1938 – Going Places (film)
- 1939 – St. Louis Blues (film)
- 1942 – Some of These Days (short)
- 1949 – Sugar Hill Times Episode 1.2 (TV series)
- 1958 – Jazz Party (DuMont TV Series)
- 1970 – The David Frost Show (TV series)
- 1986 – Brown Sugar (documentary)
- 1994 – A Great Day in Harlem (documentary)

== Theater credits ==
- 1939 – Swingin' the Dream
- 1953 – Take a Giant Step
- 1954 – Flight From Fear (directed by Powell Lindsay, a play about the numbers racket)
- 1979 – My Old Friends
