= The Family Man (1979 film) =

- Genre: Drama; Romance
- Based on: The Monogamist by Thomas Gallagher
- Written by: William Hanley
- Directed by: Glenn Jordan
- Starring: Ed Asner; Meredith Baxter Birney; Anne Jackson
- Music by: Billy Goldenberg
- Country of origin: United States
- Original language: English

Production
- Executive producers: Freyda Rothstein; David Susskind
- Producers: Ruth E. Carter (as Ruth Carter); Peter Dohanos
- Cinematography: Zale Magder
- Editors: Sidney Katz; John Wright
- Running time: 100 minutes
- Production company: Time Life Television

Original release
- Network: CBS
- Release: December 19, 1979

The Family Man is a 1979 television film, directed by Glenn Jordan and starring Ed Asner and Meredith Baxter Birney.

== Plot ==
Asner plays a prosperous Irish-born New Yorker who falls in love with a young pianist and is tempted to be unfaithful to his wife for the first time.

== Cast ==
- Edward Asner as Eddie Madden
- Meredith Baxter Birney as Mercedes Cole
- Anne Jackson as Maggie Madden
- Paul Clemens as Denny Madden
- Dick Latessa as Fred
- Michael Kirby as Walter
- Michael Wincott as Charlie
- Martin Short as Louie
- Gordon Thomson as Dance Instructor
- Michael Ironside as Bartender

== Reception ==
Writing in the New York Times, Tom Buckley gave the film a bad review, calling the script "resolutely undramatic, stilted and humorless", the directing "like stretching taffy" and Asner's accent "intermittent and unconvincing".
