= Henry LeTang =

American choreographer (1915–2007)

- Born: June 19, 1915; New York City, New York, U.S.
- Died: April 26, 2007 (aged 91); Las Vegas, Nevada, U.S.
- Occupations: Choreographer, dancer
- Children: 2

Henry LeTang (June 19, 1915 – April 26, 2007) was an American tap dancer, choreographer and dance teacher. He won the Tony Award for Best Choreography for the Broadway revue Black and Blue and taught performers including Gregory Hines, Maurice Hines and Savion Glover.

== Biography ==
Born in the Harlem neighbourhood of Manhattan, LeTang was the second son of Clarence, born in Dominica, and his wife Marie, who emigrated from St. Croix. The couple owned and operated a radio and phonograph repair shop. All their children were musically inclined; in addition to his interest in dance, LeTang played the violin. At the age of seventeen, he opened his first studio, one small room with a piano. Over the ensuing decades he taught and/or worked with a multitude of entertainment personalities, including Lena Horne, Betty Hutton, Billie Holiday, Eleanor Powell, Lola Falana, Peter Gennaro, Leslie Uggams, Joey Heatherton, Chita Rivera, Ben Vereen, Debbie Allen, Hinton Battle, Savion Glover, and the Hines brothers, Maurice and Gregory.

LeTang devised dance routines for the Broadway musicals My Dear Public and Dream with Music in the mid-1940s, but his first credit as a full-fledged choreographer was the 1952 revival of the 1921 revue Shuffle Along with Eubie Blake. Twenty-six years later, LeTang would receive Tony and Drama Desk Award nominations for his work on Eubie!, a song-and-dance tribute to the musician. Additional credits include Sophisticated Ladies (1981), which earned him a second Tony nomination, and Black and Blue (1989), which finally won him the prize. LeTang was inducted into the International Tap Dance Hall of Fame in 2015.

LeTang's screen credits include Francis Ford Coppola's The Cotton Club (1984) and Tap (1989). For television he choreographed The Garry Moore Show for seven years, staged the Jerry Lewis MDA Telethon numerous times, and created dance routines for George Balanchine and Milton Berle. His last project was the Showtime bio-film Bojangles in 2001.

Oklahoma City University presented LeTang with its Living Treasure in American Dance Award in 1995 and an honorary Doctor of Performing Arts degree in 2002. In the years before his death, LeTang lived in Las Vegas, where he taught master classes from his home studio and travelled several times a year to teach in New York City. He died in Las Vegas on April 26, 2007, at the age of 91.
