= Mercedes Ellington =

American dancer, choreographer, art director, and educator

- Born: 1939; New York City
- Education: Juilliard School
- Occupations: Dancer, Choreographer

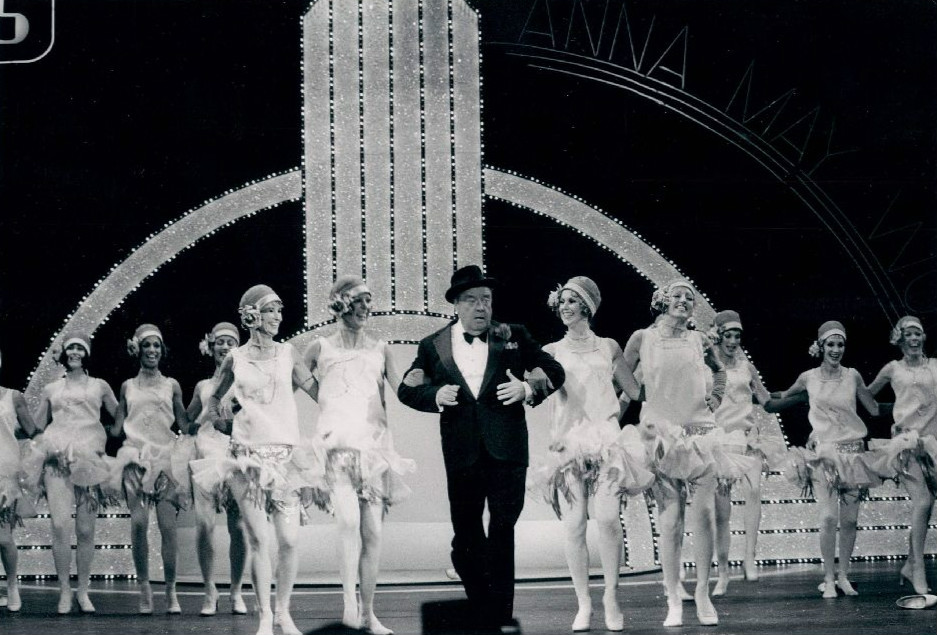
June Taylor dancers gleason special

Mercedes Ellington (born 1939) is an American dancer, choreographer, art director, and educator.

Ellington was born in New York City. She is the daughter of Mercer Ellington and the granddaughter of Edward Kennedy "Duke" Ellington. She attended the Juilliard School graduating in 1960. Her teachers included José Limón and Martha Graham. In 1963 Ellington became a member of the June Taylor Dancers. She was the first Black member of the company, appearing regularly on The Jackie Gleason Show. Ellington was one of the choreographers of the musical Sophisticated Ladies which premiered in 1981 at the Lunt-Fontanne Theatre.

She founded the Duke Ellington Center for the Arts in 2004.
