= Eubie! =

Musical revue

- Music: Eubie Blake
- Lyrics: Noble Sissle; Andy Razaf; Johnny Brandon; F. E. Miller; Jim Europe
- Book: Revue
- Productions: 1978 Broadway

Eubie! is a revue featuring the jazz and ragtime music of composer Eubie Blake, with lyrics by Noble Sissle, Andy Razaf, Johnny Brandon, F. E. Miller, and Jim Europe. The revue features no book, simply showcasing 23 of Eubie Blake's popular songs. The show was conceived by Julianne Boyd and opened in 1978, receiving positive reviews from Time, Newsweek, Variety, Backstage, and The Today Show.

== Production ==
After seven previews, the Broadway production, opened on September 20, 1978, at the Ambassador Theatre, where it ran for 439 performances. The show was conceived and directed by Julianne Boyd, choreographed by Billy Wilson and Henry LeTang, and costumed by Bernard Johnston. Vicki Carter was the musical director, pianist, and conductor. Lou Gonzalez was the sound designer.

Eubie Blake himself was nearly 100 years of age when the show opened.

The theater setting was designed to be reminiscent of the 1920s, with "curlicued settings, dancers diving down a staircase in a pie-shaped wedge, a girl in a mantilla with a Spanish rose in her teeth". Many of the songs were from the Blake-Sissle 1921 show Shuffle Along, which follows the story of two friends who are both running for mayor. Among the songs were "Charleston Rag", "Daddy", "My Handyman Ain't Handy No More", "Gee, I Wish I Had Someone to Rock Me in the Cradle of Love", and "There's a Million Little Cupids in the Sky" (from the 1924 Blake-Sissle show The Chocolate Dandies).

A few months after the show's opening on Broadway, the tour of Eubie! opened on February 7, 1979, in Baltimore.

An original cast recording was produced by Warner Brothers and released on vinyl in 1979, and was later released on CD. The production was filmed in 1981 for Showtime; it was Gregory Hines TV debut.

The New York Times noted that the show's pre-Broadway costs ran $236,000 over budget, and that despite the show's 65-week Broadway run, it “never paid backers a penny of their $350,000 investment.”

== Songs ==
Act I

1. "Good Night, Angeline" (1917), Europe and Sissle; Shuffle Along

2. "Charleston Rag" (1899)

3. "Shuffle Along" (1921), Sissle; Shuffle Along

4. "In Honeysuckle Time" (1921), Sissle; Shuffle Along

5. "I'm Just Wild About Harry" (1921), Sissle; Shuffle Along

6. "Baltimore Buzz" (1921), Sissle; Shuffle Along

7. "Daddy" (1921), Sissle; Shuffle Along

8. "There's a Million Little Cupids in the Sky" (1924), Sissle; The Chocolate Dandies

9. "I'm a Great Big Baby" (1940), Razaf; Tan Manhattan

10. "My Handy Man Ain't Handy No More" (1930), Razaf; Blackbirds of 1930

11. "Low Down Blues" (1921), Sissle; Shuffle Along

12. "Gee, I Wish I Had Someone to Rock Me in the Cradle of Love" (1919), Sissle

13. "I'm Just Simply Full of Jazz" (1919), Sissle; Shuffle Along

Act II

14. "High Steppin' Days" (1921)

15. "Dixie Moon" (1924), Sissle; The Chocolate Dandies

16. "Weary" (1940), Razaf; Tan Manhattan

17. "Roll, Jordan" (1930), Razaf

18. "Memories of You" (1930), Razaf; Blackbirds of 1930

19. "If You've Never Been Vamped by a Brownskin, You've Never Been Vamped at All" (1921), Sissle; Shuffle Along

20. "You Got to Git the Gittin While the Gittin's Good" (1956), Miller

21. "Oriental Blues" (1921), Sissle; Shuffle Along

22. "I'm Craving for That Kind of Love" (1921) Sissle; Shuffle Along

23. "Hot Feet" (1958), Sissle

24. "Good Night, Angeline" (1917), Europe and Sissle; Shuffle Along

== Cast ==
The original cast of Eubie! included an all-black cast consisting of 12 performers and nine musicians. The performers were Ethel Beatty, Terry Burrell, Leslie Dockery, Lynnie Godfrey, Gregory Hines, Maurice Hines, Mel Johnson Jr., Lonnie McNeil, Janet Powell, Marion Ramsey, Alaina Reed, Jeffery V. Thompson. Of these performers Gregory Hines and Lynnie Godfrey were nominated for awards for their performances in Eubie!

== Awards and nominations ==
=== Original Broadway production ===
Year	Award	Category	Nominee	Result
1979	Tony Award	Best Original Score	Eubie Blake, Noble Sissle, Andy Razafe, F.E. Miller, Johnny Brandon and Jim Europe	Nominated
1979	Tony Award	Best Performance by a Featured Actor in a Musical	Gregory Hines	Nominated
1979	Tony Award	Best Choreography	Billy Wilson and Henry LeTang	Nominated
1979	Drama Desk Award	Outstanding Musical		Nominated
1979	Drama Desk Award	Outstanding Featured Actress in a Musical	Lynnie Godfrey	Nominated
1979	Drama Desk Award	Outstanding Choreography	Billy Wilson and Henry LeTang	Nominated
1979	Theatre World Award		Gregory Hines	Won
