= Maurice Hines =

American actor, singer and dancer (1943–2023)

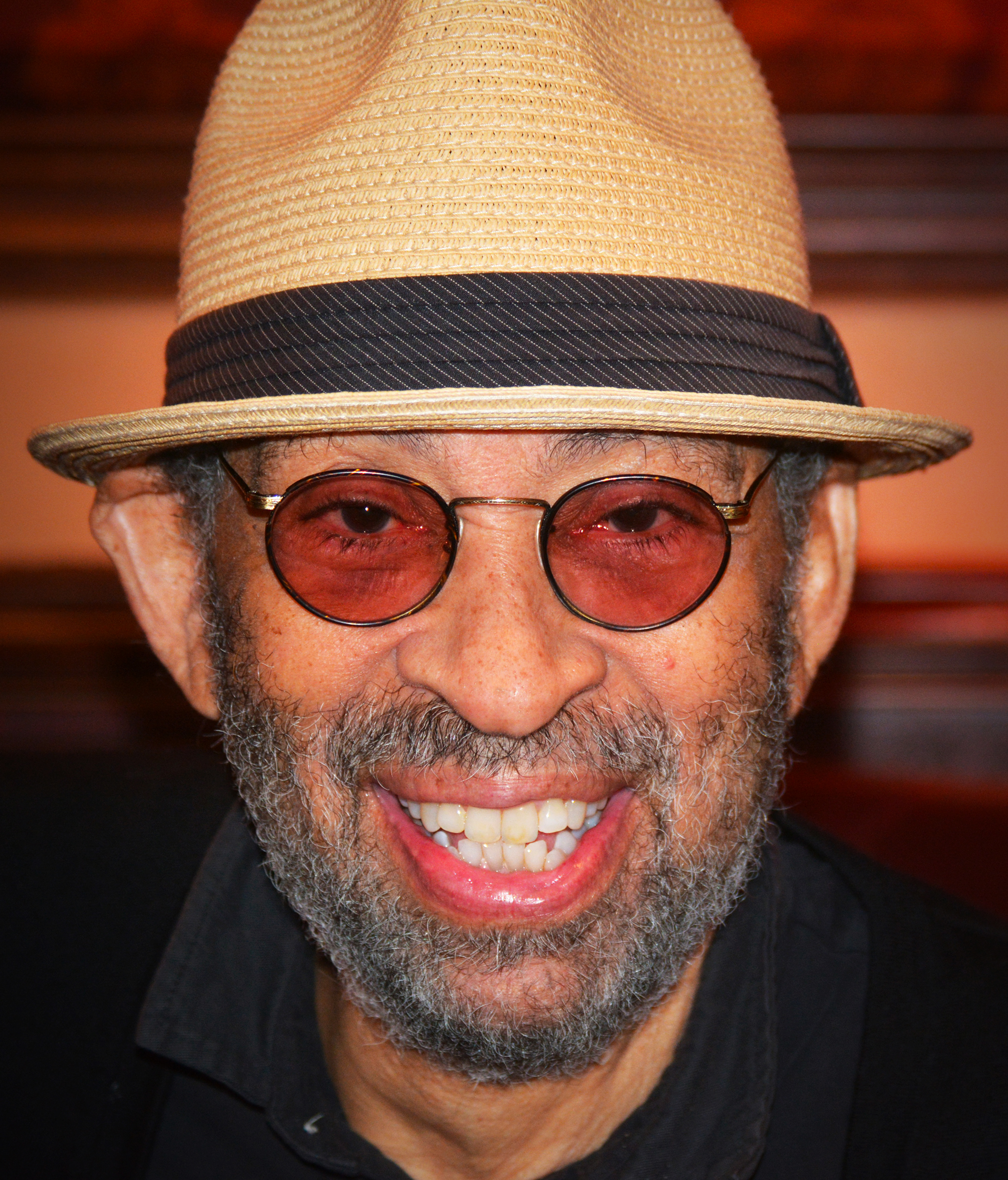
- Hines in 2023

Background information
- Born: December 13, 1943; New York City, U.S.
- Died: December 29, 2023 (aged 80) Englewood, New Jersey, U.S.
- Occupations: Actor, director, choreographer, singer
- Years active: 1954–2023
- Label: Arbors
- Website: www.mauricehines.com

Maurice Robert Hines Jr. (December 13, 1943 – December 29, 2023) was an American actor, director, singer, and choreographer. He was the older brother of dancer Gregory Hines.

== Life and career ==
Maurice Robert Hines Jr. was born on December 13, 1943, in New York City to a Catholic couple, Alma Iola (Lawless) and Maurice Robert Hines Sr., a dancer, musician, and actor. Hines began his career at the age of five, studying tap dance at the Henry LeTang Dance Studio in Manhattan. LeTang recognized his talent and began choreographing numbers specifically for him and his younger brother Gregory, patterned on the Nicholas Brothers. Maurice made his Broadway debut in The Girl in Pink Tights in 1954. Shortly after, the brothers began touring as the opening act for such headliners as Lionel Hampton and Gypsy Rose Lee. Their father joined them as "Hines, Hines & Dad" and performed on a regular basis in New York, Las Vegas, and throughout Europe and on many television shows, including The Pearl Bailey Show, The Hollywood Palace, and The Tonight Show.

He decided to pursue a solo career and was cast as Nathan Detroit in the national tour of Guys and Dolls, after which he returned to Broadway in Eubie! (1978). His additional Broadway credits include Bring Back Birdie and Sophisticated Ladies (both in 1981) as a performer, Uptown... It's Hot! (1986) as a performer (earning a Tony Award nomination as Best Actor in a Musical) and choreographer, and Hot Feet (2006), which he conceived, choreographed, and directed.

Hines co-directed and choreographed the national tour of the Louis Armstrong musical biography Satchmo and directed, choreographed, and starred in the national tour of Harlem Suite with successive leading ladies Jennifer Holliday, Stephanie Mills, and Melba Moore. He directed and choreographed Havana Night in Cuba, an all-Latino production of The Red Shoes in the Dominican Republic, and created the revue Broadway Soul Jam to inaugurate an entertainment complex in the Netherlands.

Hines directed and choreographed music videos, including one for Quincy Jones. He was the first African American to direct a production at Radio City Music Hall.

Hines appeared in only one feature film: a leading role in Francis Ford Coppola's 1984 film The Cotton Club, in which Maurice and his brother Gregory portrayed the "Williams Brothers", a tap-dancing duo reminiscent of the real-life Nicholas Brothers. Hines also appeared in Oops, Ups & Downs: The Murder Mystery of Humpty Dumpty in 2007. On television, he appeared in Eubie!, Love, Sidney, and Cosby.

Hines played the lead role in Washington, D.C.'s Arena Stage production of the Duke Ellington-inspired musical Sophisticated Ladies at the historic Lincoln Theatre in April and May 2010, featuring teenaged tap-dancing brothers John and Leo Manzari. The Washington Post review was positive for his role and the show in general.

Hines conceived, directed, and choreographed Yo Alice, an urban hip-hop fantasy written by Lee Summers and staged for a workshop in 2000 and a reading in 2007 at the Triad Theatre.

In May 2013, he performed a tribute to his late brother Gregory, entitled Tappin' Thru Life: An Evening with Maurice Hines, at the Cutler Majestic Theatre, which was reviewed by The Boston Globe as "a class act by a class act". "Tappin' " went on to Boston and the Manhattan club 54 Below, and opened in November 2013 for a six-week run at the Arena Stage, where The Washington Post wrote, "it's a pleasure to be in the company of a shameless, ebullient vaudeville heart."

The production again featured the Manzari Brothers, D.C. seventh-graders, and identical twins Max and Sam Heimowitz, who tap-danced on stage with Hines.

Originally commissioned by Arena Stage in 2004, Hines conceived and directed Ella, First Lady of Song, a tribute to Ella Fitzgerald, for whom he and his late brother Gregory Hines had opened in Las Vegas. The musical was written by Lee Summers and starred Rhythm and Blues/Jazz singer Freda Payne, known best for her 1970 hit, Band of Gold and "Brings The Boys Home". It has had three developmental out-of-town try-outs, which include The Crossroads Theatre and Metro Stage Theatre in Washington, D.C. and most recently, the Delaware Theatre Company in 2018.

In 2019, John Carluccio directed the feature film Maurice Hines: Bring Them Back, a biographical documentary about Hines. The film was awarded the Metropolis Grand Jury Prize at the DOC NYC film festival in fall 2019. The Hollywood Reporter wrote that the film "Digs much deeper than your usual showbiz doc." Joining Hines, the film included appearances by Chita Rivera, Mercedes Ellington, and Debbie Allen.

Hines died in Englewood, New Jersey, on December 29, 2023, at the age of 80.

== Filmography ==
Maurice Hines film and television credits
Year	Title	Role	Notes
1967	Away We Go	Guest Performer	Episode: #1.9
1981	Eubie!	Cast member	Filmed version of Eubie!, a musical revue show at the Ambassador Theatre (New York)
1982	Love, Sidney	Unknown role	Episode: "Charlotte's Web"
1984	The Cotton Club	Clay Williams	Film
1987	The Equalizer	Billie Bump	Episode: "Memories of Manon: Part 1"
1987	The Equalizer	Billie Bump	Episode: "Shadow Play"
1997	Cosby	Unknown role	Episode: "Shall We Dance?"
2019	This Giant Beast That is the Global Economy	Greg	TV documentary. Episode: "A.I. is the Future. Will it Keep Us Around to Enjoy It?"

== Discography ==
- I've Never Been in Love Before (Arbors, 2001)
- To Nat King Cole With Love (Arbors, 2006)
