= Gregory Hines =

American dancer, actor, and singer (1946–2003)

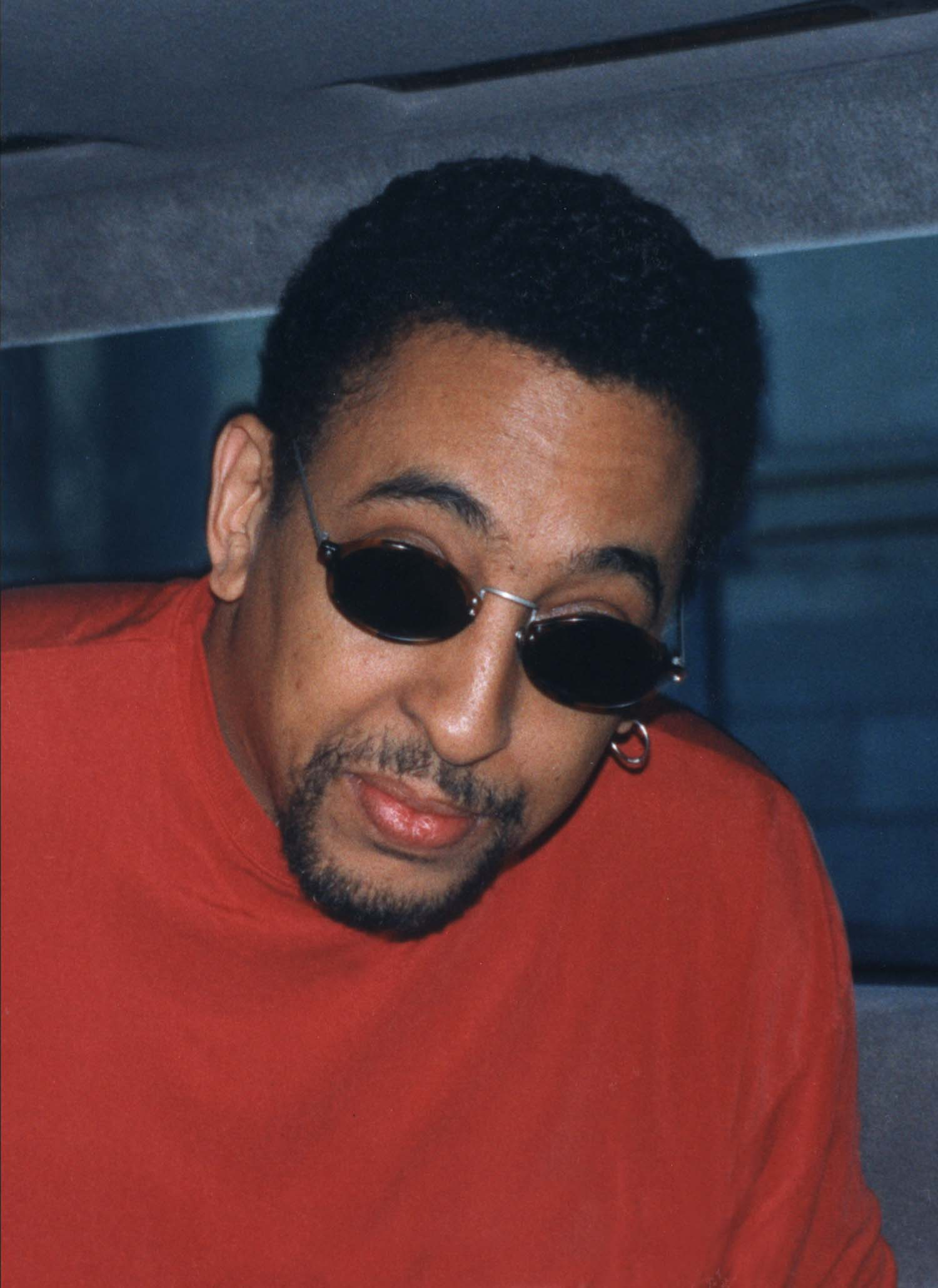
- Hines in 1993
- Born: Gregory Oliver Hines; February 14, 1946; New York City, U.S.
- Died: August 9, 2003 (aged 57); Los Angeles, California, U.S.
- Resting place: Saint Volodymyr Ukrainian Cemetery; Oakville, Ontario, Canada
- Occupations: Dancer; actor; choreographer; singer
- Years active: 1948–2003
- Spouses: Patricia Panella (m. 1968; div. 1972) Pamela Koslow (m. 1981; div. 2000)
- Partner(s): Negrita Jayde (2000–03)
- Children: 2
- Relatives: Maurice Hines (brother)

Gregory Oliver Hines (February 14, 1946 – August 9, 2003) was an American dancer, actor, choreographer, and singer. He is one of the most celebrated tap dancers of all time. As an actor, he is best known for History of the World, Part I (1981), Wolfen (1981), The Cotton Club (1984), White Nights (1985), Running Scared (1986), Tap (film) (1989), A Rage in Harlem (1991), The Gregory Hines Show (1997–98), playing Ben on Will & Grace (1999–2000), and for voicing Big Bill on the Nick Jr. animated children's television program Little Bill (1999–2004).

Hines starred in more than 40 films and also appeared on Broadway. He received many accolades, including a Daytime Emmy Award, a Drama Desk Award, and a Tony Award, as well as nominations for a Screen Actors Guild Award and four Primetime Emmy Awards.

== Early life ==
Hines was born in New York City, on February 14, 1946, to Alma Iola (Lawless) and Maurice Robert Hines, a dancer, musician, and actor, and grew up in the Sugar Hill neighborhood of Harlem. He began tap dancing when he was two years old, and began dancing semi-professionally at age five. After that, he and his older brother Maurice performed together, studying with choreographer Henry LeTang.

Gregory and Maurice also studied with veteran tap dancers such as Howard Sims and The Nicholas Brothers when they performed at the same venues. The brothers were known as The Hines Kids, making nightclub appearances at venues in Miami, Florida, with Cab Calloway. They were later known as The Hines Brothers.

When their father joined the act as a drummer, their name changed again in 1963 to Hines, Hines, and Dad.

== Career ==
=== Tap dance ===
Hines was an avid improviser of tap steps, tap sounds, and tap rhythms alike. His improvisation was like that of a drummer, doing a solo and coming up with rhythms. He also improvised the phrasing of a number of tap steps, mainly to fit the unfolding sound. A laid-back dancer, he usually wore loose-fitting pants and a tighter shirt.

Although he inherited the roots of traditional black rhythmic tap, he also promoted contemporary black rhythmic tap. "He purposely obliterated the tempos," wrote tap historian Sally Sommer, "throwing down a cascade of taps like pebbles tossed across the floor. In that moment, he aligned tap with the latest free-form experiments in jazz and new music and postmodern dance."

Throughout his career, Hines wanted and continued to be an advocate for tap in America. He successfully petitioned the creation of National Tap Dance Day in May 1989, which is now celebrated in forty cities in the United States, as well as eight other nations. He was on the board of directors of Manhattan Tap, a member of the Jazz Tap Ensemble, and a member of the American Tap Dance Foundation, which was formerly called the American Tap Dance Orchestra.

In 1989, he created and hosted a PBS special called Gregory Hines' Tap Dance in America, which featured various tap dancers such as Savion Glover and Bunny Briggs.

In 1990, Hines visited his idol (and Tap co-star) Sammy Davis Jr., who was dying of throat cancer and was unable to speak. After Davis died, an emotional Hines spoke at Davis' funeral of how Davis made a gesture to him, "as if passing a basketball ... and I caught it." Hines spoke of how honored he had been that Davis thought that he could carry on from where Davis left off.

Through his teaching, he influenced tap dancers such as Savion Glover, Dianne Walker, Ted Levy, and Jane Goldberg. In an interview with The New York Times in 1988, Hines said that everything he did was influenced by his dancing: "my singing, my acting, my lovemaking, my being a parent."

=== Stage acting ===
Hines made his Broadway debut with his brother in The Girl in Pink Tights in 1954. He earned Tony Award nominations for Eubie! (1979), Comin' Uptown (1980), and Sophisticated Ladies (1981), and won the Tony Award and Drama Desk Award for Jelly's Last Jam (1992) and the Theatre World Award for Eubie!.

=== Music ===
Hines performed as the lead singer and musician in a rock band called Severance based in Venice, Los Angeles, in 1975 and 1976. Severance was one of the house bands at an original music club called Honky Hoagies Handy Hangout, otherwise known as the 4H Club. Severance released their self-titled debut album on Largo Records (a subsidiary of GNP Crescendo) in 1976.

In 1986, he sang a duet with Luther Vandross called "There's Nothing Better Than Love", which reached the No. 1 position on the Billboard R&B charts. Encouraged by his first success on the chart, Hines subsequently released his self-titled debut album on Epic in 1988 with much support from Vandross. This album produced a Vandross-penned single "That Girl Wants to Dance with Me", which peaked at #6 on the R&B charts in June 1988.

=== Film and television ===
In 1981, Hines made his movie debut in Mel Brooks's History of the World, Part I, replacing Richard Pryor, who was originally cast in the role but sustained severe burns just days before he was due to begin shooting. Madeline Kahn, also starring in the film, suggested to director Mel Brooks that he look into Hines for the role after they learned of Pryor's hospitalization. He also appeared in the horror film Wolfen later that year.

Hines' peak as an actor came in the mid-1980s. He had a large role in The Cotton Club (1984), where he and his brother Maurice (in his sole film credit) played a 1930s tap-dancing duo reminiscent of the Nicholas Brothers. Hines co-starred with Mikhail Baryshnikov in the 1985 film White Nights, and co-starred with Billy Crystal in the 1986 buddy cop film Running Scared. He starred in the 1989 film Tap opposite Sammy Davis Jr. (in Davis' last screen performance). He appeared alongside Whitney Houston and Loretta Devine in the highly successful 1995 film Waiting to Exhale and opposite Houston, Denzel Washington and Courtney B. Vance the following year in The Preacher's Wife. On television, he starred in his own sitcom in 1997, The Gregory Hines Show, which ran for one season on CBS, and had a recurring role of Ben Doucette on Will & Grace.

In an interview in 1987, Hines said that he often looked for roles written for white actors, "preferring their greater scope and dynamics." Of his role in Running Scared, for example, he said that he enjoyed that his character had sex scenes, because "usually, the black guy has no sexuality at all."

Hines starred in the 1998 film The Tic Code. He voiced Big Bill in the Nick Jr. Channel's animated children series Little Bill, which ran from 1999 to 2004. He won the Daytime Emmy Award for Outstanding Performer in an Animated Program for the role in 2003.

=== Other ===
Hines co-hosted the Tony Awards ceremony in 1995 and 2002.

== Personal life ==
Hines' marriages to Patricia Panella and Pamela Koslow ended in divorce. He had a daughter, Daria, with Panella, and a son, Zachary with Koslow. For the last three years of his life, he was engaged to bodybuilder Negrita Jayde, who was based in Toronto.

== Death ==
Hines died of liver cancer on August 9, 2003, en route to a hospital from his home in Los Angeles. He was diagnosed with the disease a year earlier, but informed only his closest friends. At the time of his death, production of the television show Little Bill was ending. He was survived by his fiancée Jayde, children Daria and Zachary, stepdaughter Jessica, and grandson Lucian.

His funeral was held at St. Monica Catholic Church in Santa Monica, California. He was buried at St. Volodymyr Ukrainian Catholic Cemetery in Oakville, Ontario.

== Legacy ==
On January 28, 2019, the United States Postal Service honored Hines with a postage stamp as part of its Black Heritage Series. It was issued with a ceremony at the Buffalo Academy for Visual and Performing Arts.

== Awards and nominations ==
=== Emmy Awards ===
Year	Award	Category	Work	Result
1982	Primetime Emmy Award	Outstanding Individual Achievement - Special Class	I Love Liberty	Nominated
1985	Primetime Emmy Award	Outstanding Individual Performance in a Variety or Music Program	Motown Returns to the Apollo	Nominated
1989	Primetime Emmy Award	Outstanding Individual Performance in a Variety or Music Program	Tap Dance in America	Nominated
2001	Primetime Emmy Award	Outstanding Lead Actor in a Miniseries or a Movie	Bojangles	Nominated
2003	Daytime Emmy Awards	Outstanding Performer in an Animated Program	Little Bill	Won
2003	Daytime Emmy Awards	Outstanding Performer in a Children's Special	The Red Sneakers	Nominated
2003	Daytime Emmy Awards	Outstanding Directing in a Children's Special	The Red Sneakers	Nominated

=== NAACP Image Awards ===
Year	Category	Work	Result
1986	Outstanding Actor in a Motion Picture	Running Scared	Won
1988	Outstanding Actor in a Motion Picture	Off Limits	Nominated
1989	Outstanding Actor in a Motion Picture	Tap	Nominated
1996	Outstanding Actor in a Motion Picture	Waiting to Exhale	Nominated
1998	Outstanding Actor in a Comedy Series	The Gregory Hines Show	Nominated
2002	Outstanding Actor in a Television Movie, Mini-Series or Dramatic Special	Bojangles	Won

=== Tony Awards ===
Year	Category	Work	Result
1979	Best Featured Actor in a Musical	Eubie!	Nominated
1980	Best Actor in a Musical	Comin' Uptown	Nominated
1981	Best Actor in a Musical	Sophisticated Ladies	Nominated
1992	Best Actor in a Musical	Jelly's Last Jam	Won
1992	Best Choreography	Jelly's Last Jam	Nominated

=== Miscellaneous awards and honors ===
Year	Award	Category	Work	Result
1989	Theatre World Award		Eubie!	Won
1992	Drama Desk Award	Outstanding Actor in a Musical	Jelly's Last Jam	Won
1992	Drama Desk Award	Outstanding Choreography	Jelly's Last Jam	Nominated
1998	Flo-Bert Award	Lifetime Achievement Award	Himself	Honored
1998	American Comedy Awards	Funniest Male Guest Appearance in a TV Series	Will & Grace	Nominated
2000	Online Film & Television Association Award	Best Guest Actor in a Comedy Series	Will & Grace	Nominated
2002	Black Reel Awards	Outstanding Actor, TV Movie or Limited Series	Bojangles	Nominated
2002	Screen Actors Guild Awards	Outstanding Performance by a Male Actor in a Miniseries or Television Movie	Bojangles	Nominated

== Filmography ==
- Finian's Rainbow (1968) – Child Extra
- Sesame Street (TV) (1979–80) – Himself
- History of the World, Part I (1981) – Josephus
- Wolfen (1981) – Coroner Whittington
- Deal of the Century (1983) – Ray Kasternak
- The Muppets Take Manhattan (1984) – Roller Skater
- The Cotton Club (1984) – 'Sandman' Williams
- White Nights (1985) – Raymond Greenwood
- Faerie Tale Theatre: "Puss in Boots" (1985) – Edgar
- Amazing Stories: (TV) "The Amazing Falsworth" (1985) – Falsworth
- About Tap (1985) – Himself
- Running Scared (1986) – Detective Ray Hughes
- Off Limits (1988) – Albaby Perkins
- Tap (1989) – Max Washington
- Gregory Hines' Saigon (1987) – Himself
- Gregory Hines' Tap Dance in America (1989) – Himself
- Eve of Destruction (1991) – Colonel Jim McQuade
- A Rage in Harlem (1991) – 'Goldy'
- White Lie (1991) – Len Madison Jr.
- T Bone N Weasel (1992) – 'T-Bone'
- Dead Air (1994) – Mark Jannek / Jim Sheppard
- Renaissance Man (1994) – Sergeant Cass
- Kangaroo Court (1994)
- Happily Ever After: Fairy Tales for Every Child (1995, Episode "Beauty and the Beast") – The Beast / Prince Koro (voice)
- A Stranger in Town (1995) – Barnes
- Waiting to Exhale (1995) – Marvin King
- Good Luck (1996) – Bernard 'Bern' Lemley
- Mad Dog Time (1996) – Jules Flamingo
- The Preacher's Wife (1996) – Joe Hamilton
- The Cherokee Kid (1996) – Jedediah Turner / The Undertaker
- Subway Stories: Tales From the Underground (1997) – Jack (segment "Manhattan Miracle")
- The Gregory Hines Show (1997–98) – Ben Stevenson
- Blue's Clues (1999, Episode Blue's Big Treasure Hunt) – Jack
- The Tic Code (1999) – Tyrone Pike
- Will & Grace (TV) (1999–2000) – Ben Doucette
- Things You Can Tell Just by Looking at Her (2000) – Robert (segment "Fantasies About Rebecca")
- Who Killed Atlanta's Children? (TV) (2000) – Ron Larson
- Once in the Life (2000) – Ruffhouse
- Bojangles (2001) – Bojangles
- Venice: Lost and Found (2002) – Himself
- The Red Sneakers (TV) (2002) – Zeke
- Law & Order: (TV) "Suicide Box" (2003) – Carl Helpert
- Lost at Home (TV) (2003) – Jordan King
- The Root (2003)
- Little Bill (TV) (1999–2004, until his death) – Bill 'Big Bill' (final television appearance)
- Keeping Time: The Life, Music & Photography of Milt Hinton (2004) – Himself
- Love That Girl, Sally (2004) – Fred (final film role; dedicated production)

== See also ==
- List of dancers
