= Anise Boyer =

American dancer and actress (1914–2008)

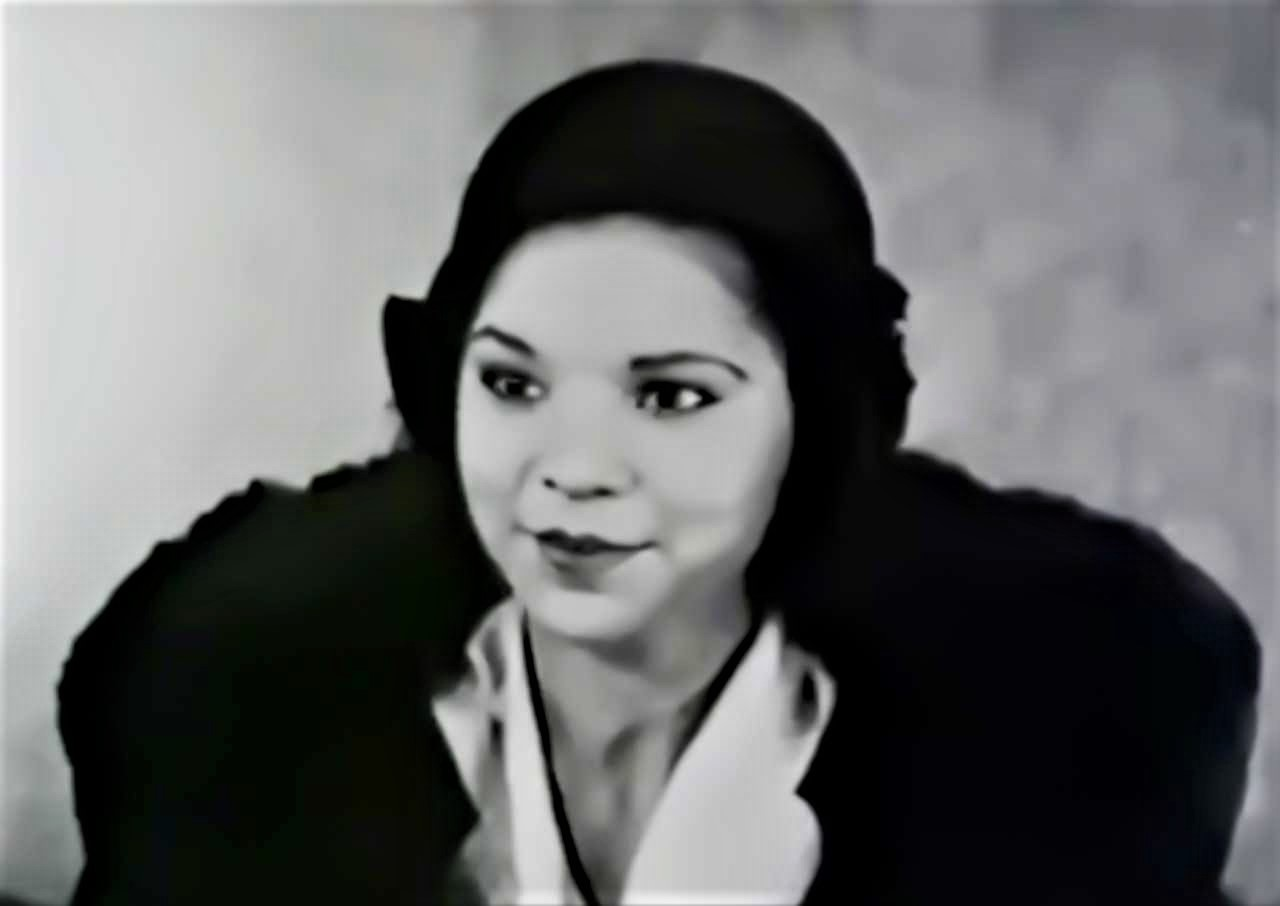
- Boyer in Harlem Is Heaven, 1932
- Born: April 15, 1914; Florida
- Died: October 10, 2008 (aged 94); Los Angeles
- Other names: Anise Dixon, Anise Clark, Anise Burris
- Occupations: Actress and dancer
- Spouse(s): Al Dixon, Robert Clark, Phillip Burris

Anise Margaret Boyer (1914–2008) was an American dancer and actress known for her work during the Harlem Renaissance. She joined the Cotton Club chorus line when she was a teenager and starred in the 1932 film Harlem is Heaven. She also danced in the duo Anise and Åland, travelling extensively with Cab Calloway's band. She retired from the entertainment industry in 1948.

== Early life and stardom ==
Boyer was born on April 15, 1914, in Florida. She was already dancing in revues by age seven or eight. Her first recognition came in 1924, when she won a talent competition sponsored by Noble Sissle and Eubie Blake. She also excelled at Hunter College High School in New York City.

She joined the chorus line of Harlem's famed Cotton Club in 1928. In 1931, the Pittsburgh Courier wrote that she had been "Harlem's most charming juvenile dancer" for several seasons. Commentator Walter Winchell, in his syndicated column, repeatedly called her the prettiest dancer at the club.

In 1932, Boyer appeared in the film Harlem Is Heaven, starring opposite Bill "Bojangles" Robinson. Reviewing the film, The Pittsburgh Courier called her a "sensation" and wrote, "Her talent and ability is [sic] instantly recognized the moment she makes her appearance."

In the late 1930s and early 1940s, Boyer danced with Al Dixon as Anise and Åland, often performing with Cab Calloway's band. They performed internationally and danced at venues including the Apollo Theater, the Cotton Club, and the Orpheum Theater in Los Angeles. They were known for a type of dance called "adagio", which combined ballroom dance with lifts and spins. The two wed in 1942, just before Dixon was drafted into military service—an event that ended their career as a dance team.

In 1943 and 1944, Boyer appeared in a series of Los Angeles revues: Africana at the Music Box, Blue Rhapsody at the Alabam, and Sweet 'n Hot at the Mayan Theater. She also made uncredited appearances dancing in the 1943 film Stormy Weather and in the 1944 film Carolina Blues (the latter in a number with Harold Nicholas). Around this time, Dixon performed with Archie Savage as Archie and Anise, including in the Blue Rhapsody and Sweet 'n Hot revues. Their partnership was short-lived: Savage was sentenced to prison for theft from Ethel Waters in February 1944.

Boyer was a light-skinned black woman and was encouraged by her agent to attempt to pass as white to get more work, a suggestion she rejected.

== Retirement from entertainment, later life, and death ==
In 1946, Boyer began working at the Los Angeles office of attorney Walter L. Gordon Jr. She married Robert Clark, who previously had been married to actress Louise Beavers, the following year. Boyer filmed an uncredited appearance in the Louis Jordan film Look-Out Sister in 1948, then retired from the entertainment industry.

In 1951, she was said to be seeking a divorce because Clark had physically abused her. The two nonetheless remained married for some time. In 1967, Boyer married Phillip Burris in Los Angeles.

Boyer enjoyed golf. She was a charter member of L.A.'s Vernondale Golf Club, a pioneering club for African-American women, and she served as the organization's president in 1949.

Boyer died on October 10, 2008, of natural causes. She lived in Los Angeles at the time of her death.

== See also ==
- List of dancers
