= Barbara Slater =

Barbara Slater may refer to:

- Barbara Slater (actress) (1920–1997), American film actress
- Barbara Slater (sports producer) (born 1959), sports producer and former gymnast
