= Putney Dandridge =

American jazz pianist and singer

- Birth name: Louis Dandridge
- Born: January 13, 1902 Richmond, Virginia, U.S.
- Died: February 15, 1946 (aged 44) Wall Township, New Jersey, U.S.
- Genres: Jazz
- Occupation: Musician
- Instrument(s): Piano, vocals
- Years active: 1918–1936
- Formerly of: Lonnie Johnson

Louis "Putney" Dandridge (January 13, 1902 – February 15, 1946) was an American jazz pianist and singer.

== Career ==
Born in Richmond, Virginia, United States, Dandridge began performing in 1918 as a pianist in a revue entitled The Drake and Walker Show. In 1930, he worked as accompanist for tap dancer Bill "Bojangles" Robinson, including appearances in the musical Brown Buddies. In February 1931, Dandridge appeared in the cast of the musical revue Heatin' Up Harlem, starring Adelaide Hall at the Lafayette Theatre, Harlem. In the 1932 American film Harlem Is Heaven, Dandridge, on the piano and reciting lyrics in a "speak set", accompanies Robinson as the dancer sings "Is You Is Or Is You Ain't".

After touring in Illinois and the Great Lakes region, Dandridge settled in Cleveland, Ohio, forming a band with guitarist Lonnie Johnson. This period lasted until 1934, when he attempted to perform as a solo act. He took his show to New York City, beginning a series of long residences at the Hickory House on 52nd Street and other local clubs. From 1935 to 1936, he recorded numerous sides under his own name, many of which highlighted some major jazz talents of the period, including Roy Eldridge, Teddy Wilson, Henry "Red" Allen, Buster Bailey, John Kirby, Chu Berry, Cozy Cole and more. Appearing to vanish from the music scene in the late 1930s, it is speculated that Dandridge may have been forced to retire due to ill health.

Dandridge died in Wall Township, New Jersey, in February 1946, at the age of 44.

== Discography ==
- Putney Dandridge (Timeless, 1994)
