= James Baskett =

American actor (1904–1948)

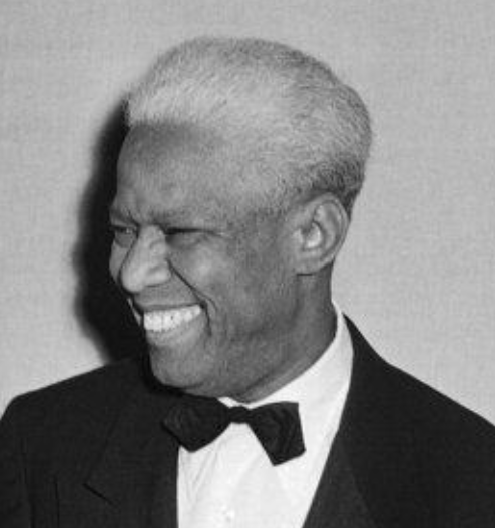
- Baskett at the 20th Academy Awards, 1948, a few months before his death
- Born: February 16, 1904; Indianapolis, Indiana, U.S.
- Died: July 9, 1948 (aged 44); Los Angeles, California, U.S.
- Resting place: Crown Hill Cemetery (Indianapolis, Indiana) and Arboretum, Section 37, Lot 602; 39.8229468°N 86.1762391°W
- Other names: Jimmie Baskette; Jimmy Baskette; Jim Basquette
- Occupations: Actor; singer
- Years active: 1929–1948
- Spouse: Margaret Baskett

James Franklin Baskett (February 16, 1904 – July 9, 1948) was an American actor who portrayed Uncle Remus in the 1946 Disney feature film Song of the South. His performance included singing the song "Zip-a-Dee-Doo-Dah". In recognition of his portrayal of Remus, he was given an Honorary Academy Award in 1948.

== Career ==
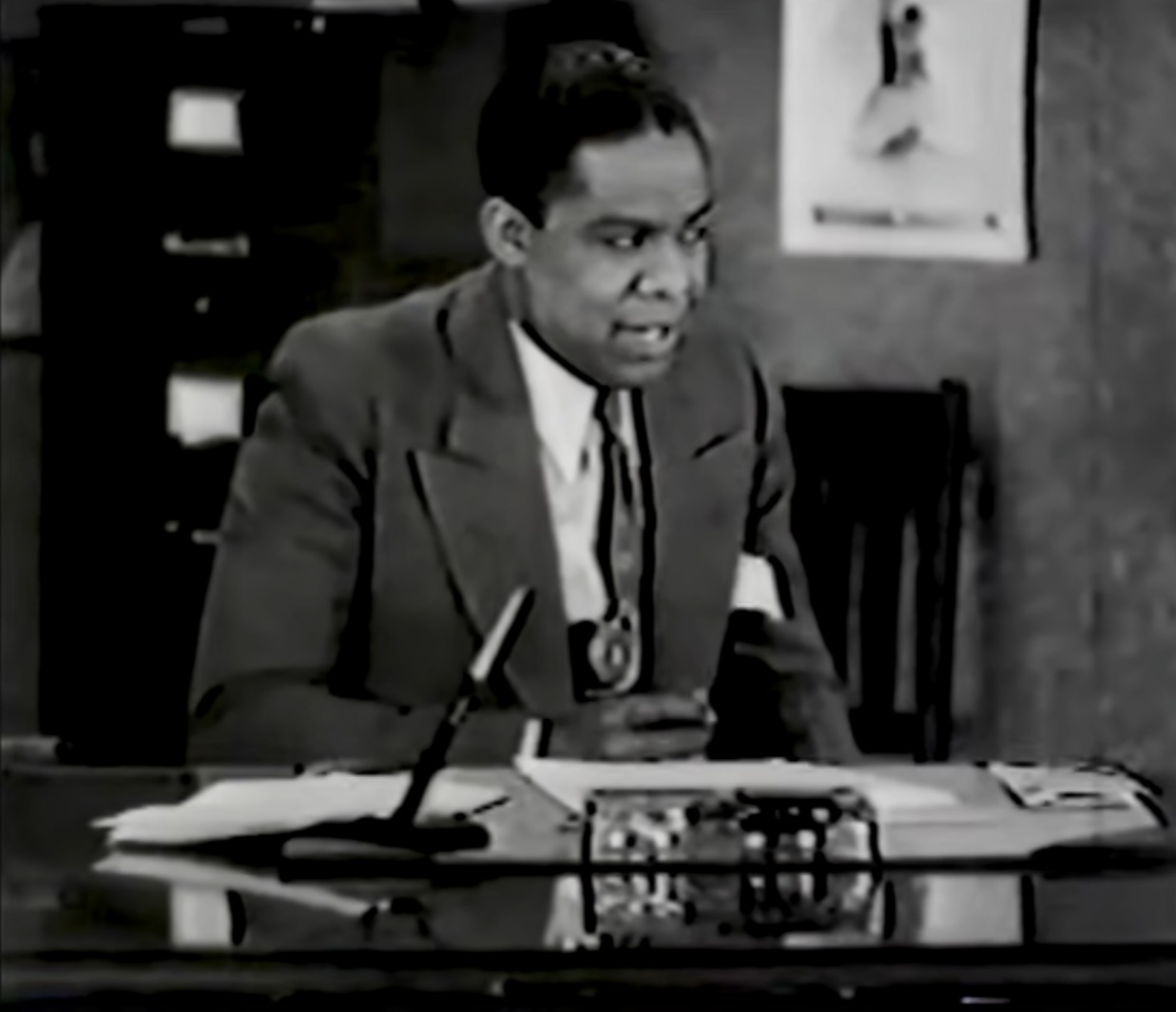
Baskett in Harlem Is Heaven (1932), in which Variety described his portrayal of "Money" Johnson as "very impressive"

Baskett studied pharmacology as a young man but gave it up to pursue an acting career. He first moved to New York City, New York, where he joined up with Bill 'Mr. Bojangles' Robinson. Using the name Jimmie Baskette, he appeared with Louis Armstrong on Broadway in the 1929 black musical revue Hot Chocolates and in several all-black New York films, including Harlem is Heaven (1932).

He later moved to Los Angeles, California, and had a supporting role in the film Straight to Heaven (1939), starring Nina Mae McKinney. In 1941 he voiced Fats Crow in the animated Disney film Dumbo, and he also had bit parts in several B movies, including that of Lazarus in Revenge of the Zombies (1943), a porter in The Heavenly Body (1944), and native tribal leader Orbon in Jungle Queen (1945). From 1944 until 1948, he was part of the cast of the Amos 'n' Andy Show live radio program as lawyer Gabby Gibson.

In 1945, he auditioned for a bit part voicing one of the animals in the new Disney feature film Song of the South (1946), based on the Uncle Remus stories by Joel Chandler Harris. Walt Disney was impressed with Baskett's talent and hired him on the spot for the lead role of Uncle Remus. Baskett was also given the voice role of Br'er Fox, one of the film's animated antagonists, and also filled in as the main animated protagonist, Br'er Rabbit, in one sequence. This was one of the first Hollywood portrayals of a black actor as a non-comic character in a leading role in a film meant for general audiences.

Baskett was prohibited from attending the film's premiere in Atlanta, Georgia, because Atlanta was racially segregated by law.

Although Baskett was occasionally criticized for accepting such a "demeaning" role (most of his acting credits were that of African-American stereotypes), his acting was almost universally praised, and columnist Hedda Hopper, along with Walt Disney, was one of the many journalists and personalities who declared that he should receive an Academy Award for his work. Baskett defended the film and his character in it, saying, "I believe that certain groups are doing my race more harm in seeking to create dissension, than can ever possibly come out of the Song of the South."

=== Academy Honorary Award ===
On March 20, 1948, Baskett received an Academy Honorary Award for his performance as Uncle Remus.

He was the first African-American male actor to earn an Academy Award. Additionally, Baskett was the last adult actor to receive an Honorary Oscar for a single performance.

== Illness and death ==
Baskett had been in poor health during the filming of Song of the South due to chronic heart and kidney disease, and he suffered a heart attack in December 1946 shortly after its release. His health continued to decline, and he was often unable to attend the Amos 'n' Andy radio show he was on, missing almost half of the 1947–1948 season. On July 9, 1948, during the show's summer hiatus, James Baskett died at his home of heart failure at age 44. He was survived by his wife Margaret and his mother Elizabeth. He is buried at Crown Hill Cemetery in Indianapolis.

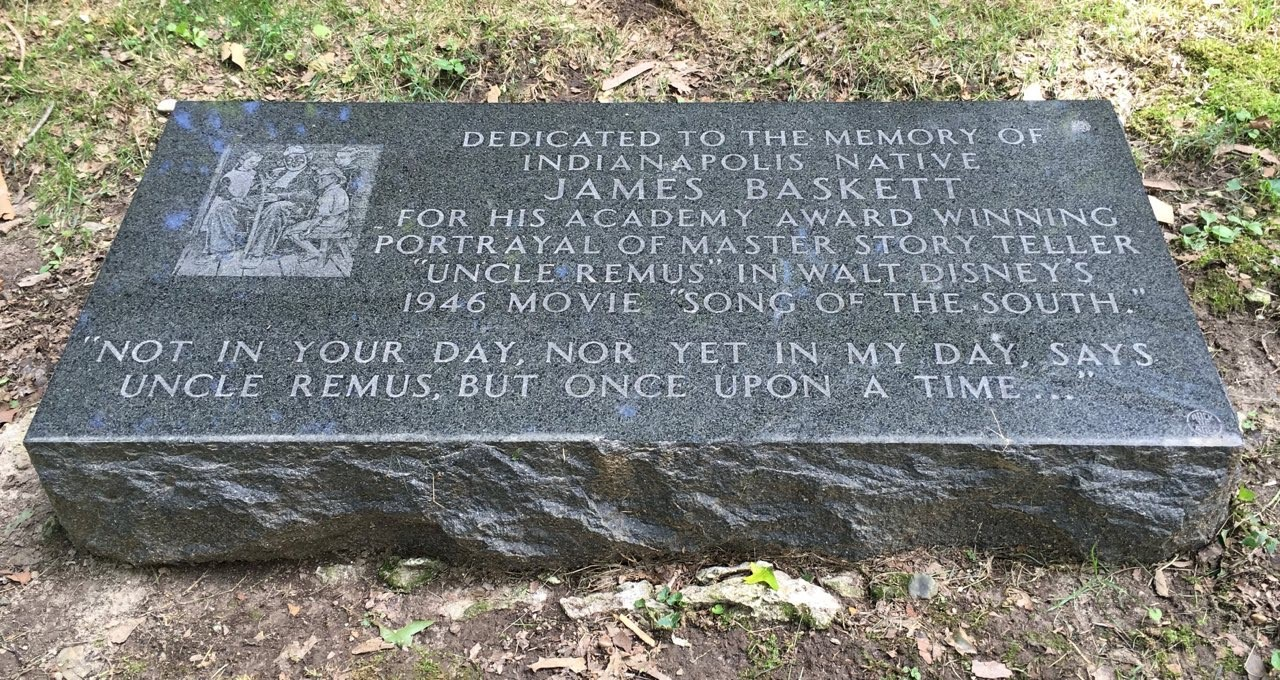
Dedication tombstone for James Baskett at Crown Hill Cemetery

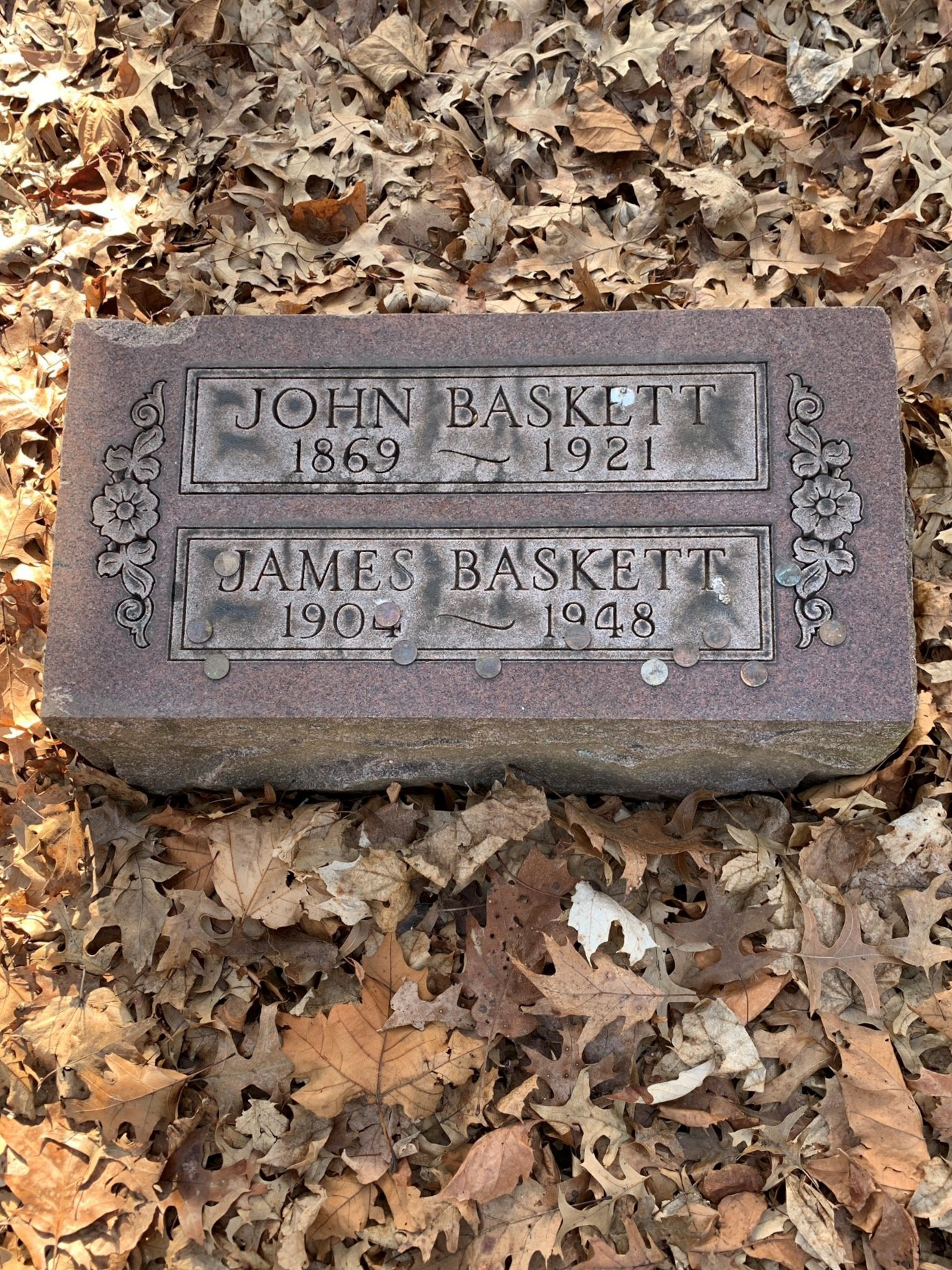
Tombstone for James Baskett and John Baskett at Crown Hill Cemetery

== Filmography ==
Year	Title	Role	Notes
1932	Harlem Is Heaven	Money Johnson	Film debut; credited as Jimmy Baskette
1933	20,000 Cheers for the Chain Gang	Vocalist	Uncredited
1938	Gone Harlem	unknown	Credited as Jimmie Baskette
1938	Policy Man	unknown	Credited as Jimmie Baskette
1939	Straight to Heaven	First Detective	
1940	Comes Midnight	unknown	
1941	Dumbo	Fats Crow (voice)	Uncredited
1943	Revenge of the Zombies	Lazarus	Alternative title: The Corpse Vanished
1944	The Heavenly Body	Porter	Uncredited
1945	Jungle Queen	Orbon	Credited as Jim Basquette
1946	Song of the South	Uncle Remus; Br'er Fox (voice); Br'er Rabbit ("Laughing Place" segment) (voice)	Last film roles

== See also ==
- List of African-American firsts
