= Walter Gordon =

Walter Gordon may refer to:

- Jamaa Fanaka (Walter Gordon, 1942–2012), African-American filmmaker
- Walter A. Gordon (1894–1976), African-American political figure and American football player for University of California, Berkeley
- Walter Henry Gordon (1863–1924), American World War I general
- Walter L. Gordon (1906–1987), Canadian politician and cabinet minister
- Walter L. Gordon Jr. (1908-2012), African-American attorney
- Walter Gordon (veteran) (1920–1997), American World War II veteran
- Walter Gordon (physicist) (1893–1939), German physicist active in the 1920s
