= Bojangles (film) =

2001 American television film

- DVD cover
- Based on: Mr. Bojangles: The Biography of Bill Robinson by James Haskins and N.R. Mitgang
- Written by: Richard Wesley; Robert P. Johnson
- Directed by: Joseph Sargent
- Starring: Gregory Hines; Peter Riegert; Kimberly Elise
- Music by: Terence Blanchard
- Country of origin: United States
- Original language: English

Production
- Executive producers: Gregory Hines; Robert Riesenberg; Fran Saperstein; Richard Vane
- Producer: Laurie Mirsky
- Cinematography: Donald M. Morgan
- Editor: B.J. Sears
- Running time: 101 minutes
- Production company: MGM Television

Original release
- Network: Showtime
- Release: February 4, 2001

Bojangles is a 2001 American made-for-television biographical drama film that chronicles the life of entertainer Bill "Bojangles" Robinson (1878–1949). Robinson is played by Gregory Hines, who also served as an executive producer. Bojangles was produced by Darrick Productions and MGM Television for the Showtime premium cable network.

== Synopsis ==
Starting with Bill Robinson's funeral, including what looks like archival footage of the event, the film then plays out the biography in a straightforward manner as a flashback, both in color and black-and-white.

== Cast ==
- Gregory Hines as Bill "Bojangles" Robinson
  - Caliaf St. Aubin as Young Luther "Bill" Robinson
- Kimberly Elise as Fannie S. Clay
- Peter Riegert as Marty Forkins
- Maria Ricossa as Rae Samuels
- Savion Glover as Newcomer
- Jonathan Higgins as Darryl F. Zanuck
- Lea Marie Golde as Shirley Temple
- Jackie Richardson as Bedelia Robinson
- Philip Akin as Frederick Williamson
- Arnold Pinnock as Lincoln Perry
- Quancetia Hamilton as Hattie McDaniel
- Richard Yearwood as Randy Benson
- Martin Roach as Percy Robinson
  - Aaron Meeks as Young William "Percy" Robinson
- Aaron Poole as Ad Schaumer
- Bill Lake as David Butler
- Richard Chevolleau as Militant
- Ayodele Casel as Dancer
- Melissa Haizlip as Dancer

== Accolades ==
Award	Category	Nominees	Result
Primetime Emmy Awards	Outstanding Lead Actor in a Miniseries or Movie	Gregory Hines	Nominated
Golden Reel Awards	Best Sound Editing in Television - Dialogue & ADR, Long Form	Anthony Mazzei, Doug Kent, Ian Morgan, Ralph Osborn, Sonya Lindsay & David Beadle	Nominated
Screen Actors Guild Awards	Outstanding Performance by a Male Actor in a Miniseries or Television Movie	Gregory Hines	Nominated
