= Policy Man =

American film (1938)

- Directed by: Irwin Franklyn
- Produced by: Irwin Franklyn, Hazel Franklyn
- Starring: Ethel Moses, Jimmie Baskett, Count Bassie, Ann Harleman, Henry Wessels
- Color process: black and white
- Production company: Creative Films Corporation
- Distributed by: Sack Amusement Entertainment
- Release date: July 1, 1938
- Country: United States
- Language: English

Policy Man, is a 1938 American feature film in black and white, and is now a lost film. It was advertised as having an "all colored cast", featuring Ethel Moses, Jimmie Baskett, and Count Bassie. It was directed by Irwin Franklyn, and produced by Irwin Franklyn and Hazel Franklyn.

== About ==
Policy Man was an urban crime film that portrayed sophisticated African Americans in Harlem. It included in its plot a person involved in a numbers game lotteries (or a gambler), and the numbers racket (or illegal gambling). It was a popular film in northern cities in the United States.

The cast included Ann Harleman, Henry, Wessels, Ethel Moses, Jimmie Baskett, and Count Bassie. The film features musical groups The Plantation Club Chorus (or N.Y. Plantation Club Chorus), The Al Taylor Orchestra, The Savoy Lindy Hoppers, and The Big Apples.

It was one of a series of Creative Films Corporation produced urban crime films, all directed by Irwin Franklyn. Advertising materials for the film are extant.
