= Irwin Franklyn =

American publicist, writer, filmmaker (1904–1966)

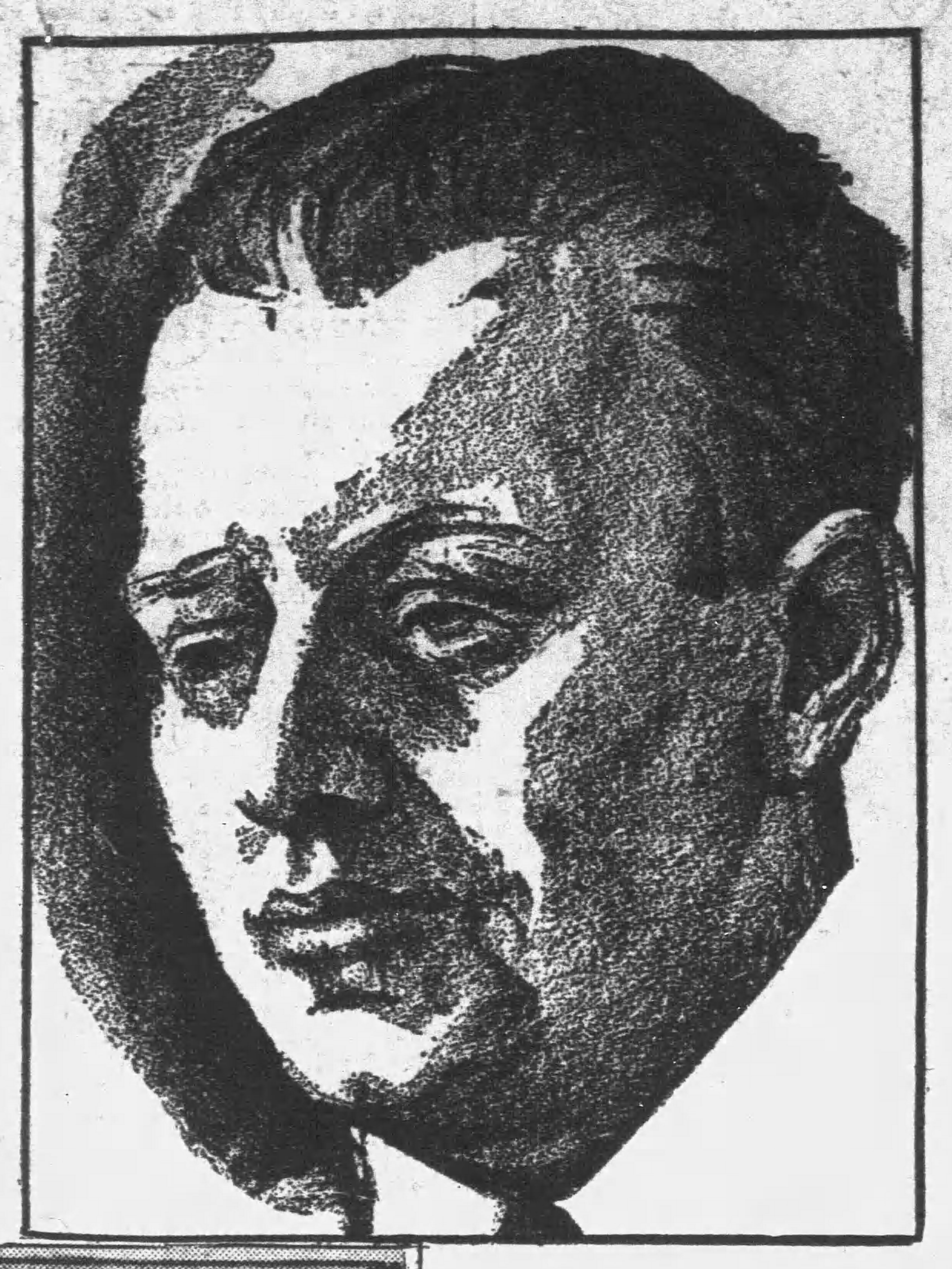
- Franklin, 1931
- Born: Irwin Richard Franklyn; January 18, 1904; New York City, New York, U.S.
- Died: September 7, 1966 (aged 62); California, U.S.
- Burial place: Forest Lawn Memorial Park (Hollywood Hills)
- Other names: Irwin R. Franklin
- Occupations: Publicist, novelist, writer, screenwriter, film director, film producer
- Spouse(s): Nan Chapman (divorced), Hazel Greene
- Children: 2

Irwin Richard Franklyn (1904–1966) was an American film director, film producer, screenwriter, novelist, and publicist. He wrote novelizations of films including Flight: An Epic of the Air for Frank Capra's film. He is also known as Irwin R. Franklin.

== Biography ==
Irwin Richard Franklyn was born on January 18, 1904, in New York City. In 1922, he moved to Hollywood, California, to work as a publicity director for film producer Thomas H. Ince. Franklyn's work in film was in the creation of many "Negro films" in the 1930s and 1940s.

He died on September 7, 1966, after suffering from a heart attack, and is buried at Forest Lawn Memorial Park in the Hollywood Hills. Franklyn had been married to Hazel Greene, whom he worked with in film and together they had two children. Franklyn had previously been married to Nan Chapman, which ended in divorce; this divorce was mentioned in part of the New York Supreme Court, Nan Petersen vs. John P. Petersen (1934).

== Filmography ==
=== Novelizations ===
- Flight, novelization of Frank Capra film
- Song of Love (1929), novelization of photoplay

=== As producer, director, or screenplay writer ===
- Harlem Is Heaven (1932), screenplay writer and director
- Harlemania
- Policy Man (1938) director, and co-produced with Hazel Franklyn
- Gone Harlem (1938) director
- Sugar Baby Hill (1938) director
- Minstrel Man (1944) co-wrote screenplay adaptation
- Waterfront (1944) co-wrote screenplay adaptation
- The Lady Confesses (1945), screenplay writer
- The Woman from Tangier (1948), screenplay writer
- Daughter of the West (1949), screenplay adaptation
