= Robert Foulk =

American actor (1908–1989)

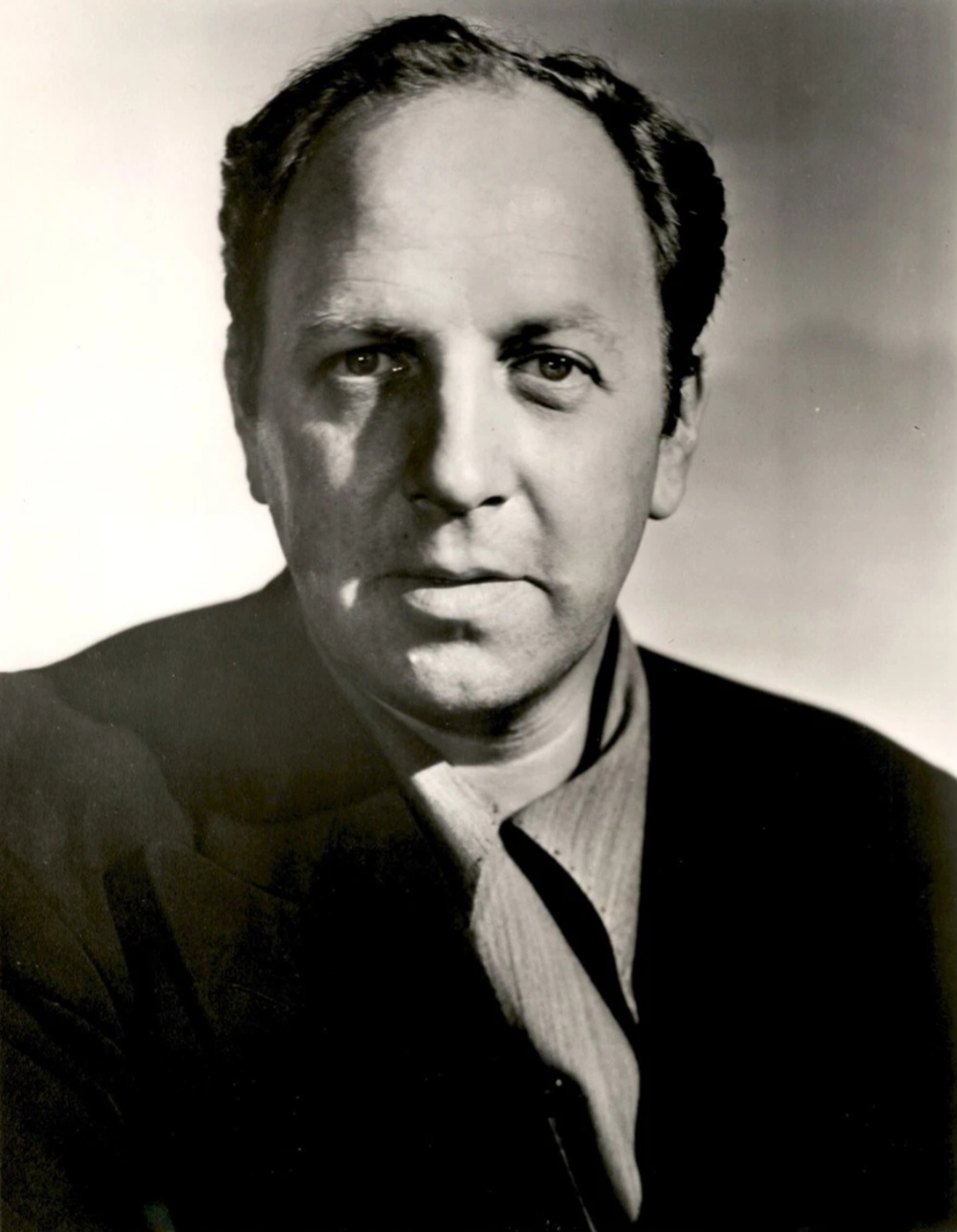
- Foulk in 1960
- Born: Robert C. Foulk; May 5, 1908; Philadelphia, Pennsylvania, U.S.
- Died: February 25, 1989 (aged 80); Los Angeles, California, U.S.
- Education: University of Pennsylvania
- Occupation: Actor
- Years active: 1949–1977
- Spouse(s): Alice Frost Barbara Slater (m. 1947)

Robert C. Foulk (May 5, 1908 – February 25, 1989) was an American television and film character actor who portrayed Sheriff H. Miller in the CBS series Lassie from 1958 to 1962.

== Early years ==
Foulk attended the University of Pennsylvania, studying to be an architectural draftsman.

== Stage ==
=== Acting ===
Foulk's Broadway credits include What a Life, Brother Rat (1936), Boy Meets Girl (1935), and two productions of As Husbands Go in 1930 and in 1932.

=== Directing ===
Foulk was an aide to producer-director George Abbott, and he went on to direct productions in places such as Palos Verdes.

== Television ==
Between 1953 and 1959, Foulk was in thirteen episodes of the NBC anthology series, The Loretta Young Show. From 1954 to 1957, he was in five episodes as Ed Davis in the sitcom Father Knows Best with Robert Young, when the series aired on NBC. In 1956, he played Jackley in the Walt Disney Mickey Mouse Club serial "The Mystery of the Applegate Treasure".

In 1957 and 1958, Foulk played the outlaw Curly Bill Brocius in three episodes, "Gunslinger from Galeville", "Ride Out at Noon", and "Skeleton Canyon Massacre", of the western television series Tombstone Territory. In 1958, Foulk portrayed Sheriff Brady in the film, The Left Handed Gun. From 1959 to 1960, he had the recurring role of bartender Joe Kingston in the NBC western series Wichita Town. Foulk appeared in five episodes of The Rifleman. He played the blacksmith Toomey in "The Second Witness" (episode 23), "Three Legged Terror" (episode 30) and "Outlaw's Inheritance" (episode 38). He played Johannson in "The Raid" (episode 37) and Herbert Newman in "The Lost Treasure of Canyon Town" (episode 99).

Foulk made four appearances on CBS's Perry Mason, all of them as a law-enforcement officer including the 1958 episode 'The Case of the Buried Clock'. He appeared as the sheriff of Cloverville, California in the two-part episode of The Untouchables, "The Big Train," which dealt with the attempt to free Al Capone from the train transporting him to Alcatraz. He made thirteen appearances on NBC's Bonanza, mostly as a sheriff or deputy sheriff. He also had recurring roles as Mr. Wheeler and Roy Trendall, former Hooterville phone company president, in sixteen episodes of CBS's Green Acres. In 1960, he guest starred in the TV Western Bat Masterson, playing Judge Pete Perkins, the town's crooked judge in S2E30's "Welcome To Paradise". In the early 1970s, Foulk made four guest appearances on CBS's Here's Lucy in various roles.

== Architecture ==
In addition to acting, Foulk worked as an architectural draftsman. An article in the Chicago Tribune reported, "... he keeps his finger in architecture because he finds it good therapy for the tensions that build up while performing."

== Personal life and death ==
In the 1930s, Foulk was married to actress Alice Frost. In 1947, he married Barbara Slater, an actress who appeared in two Three Stooges short features. She left Hollywood in the same year. They remained married until his death in 1989.

== Filmography ==
=== Film ===
- Road House (1948) as Policeman at Road House (uncredited)
- That Wonderful Urge (1948) as Workman (uncredited)
- Come to the Stable (1949) as Policeman – New York City (uncredited)
- White Heat (1949) as Oil Refinery Payroll Guard (uncredited)
- Thieves' Highway (1949) as Taller Cop at Roadside Bar (uncredited)
- Johnny Stool Pigeon (1949) as Pete (uncredited)
- Whirlpool (1950) as Andy – Policeman (uncredited)
- Love That Brute (1950) as Delivery Man (uncredited)
- Where the Sidewalk Ends (1950) as Fenney (uncredited)
- Mystery Street (1950) as Detective O'Hara (uncredited)
- A Lady Without Passport (1950) as Vice Consul (uncredited)
- Between Midnight and Dawn (1950) as Fred – Jailer (uncredited)
- Mister 880 (1950) as Policeman (uncredited)
- Dial 1119 (1950) as Barnes' Co-Worker (uncredited)
- The Killer That Stalked New York (1950) as Cop (uncredited)
- Mrs. O'Malley and Mr. Malone (1950) as Tim (uncredited)
- Charlie's Haunt (1950) as Joel
- The Lemon Drop Kid (1951) as Victim (uncredited)
- Stop That Cab (1951) as Park Manor Doorman (uncredited)
- Follow the Sun (1951) as Highway Patrolman Jennings (uncredited)
- Home Town Story (1951) as Electric Company Worker (uncredited)
- Night into Morning (1951) as Policeman at Fire (uncredited)
- The Strip (1951) as Deputy (uncredited)
- The Guy Who Came Back (1951) as Wrestling Manager (uncredited)
- Chain of Circumstance (1951) as Policeman (uncredited)
- The Mob (1951) as Thug Beating Mary (uncredited)
- Saturday's Hero (1951) as McCabe's Butler (uncredited)
- The Whip Hand (1951) as Guard (uncredited)
- The Unknown Man (1951) as Sam (uncredited)
- Elopement (1951) as Bert – Trucker (uncredited)
- Just This Once (1952) as Busy Line Cafe Owner (uncredited)
- Deadline - U.S.A. (1952) as Rienzi Associate (uncredited)
- Singin' in the Rain (1952) as Matt – Policeman (uncredited)
- Carbine Williams (1952) as Chain-Gang Guard (uncredited)
- Without Warning! (1952) as Wilson, Motel Manager
- The Sniper (1952) as Officer Rivers (uncredited)
- The San Francisco Story (1952) as Thompson
- The Girl in White (1952) as 2nd Mover (uncredited)
- The Sellout (1952) as Prisoner (uncredited)
- Glory Alley (1952) as Bouncer (uncredited)
- Carrie (1952) as Sven (uncredited)
- Don't Bother to Knock (1952) as Doorman (uncredited)
- O. Henry's Full House (1952) as Cop (segment "The Cop and the Anthem") (uncredited)
- My Pal Gus (1952) as Mr. Evans (uncredited)
- Androcles and the Lion (1952) as Soldier (uncredited)
- Stars and Stripes Forever (1952) as Joe – Plainclothesman (uncredited)
- All Ashore (1953) as Ship's Purser (uncredited)
- I Love Melvin (1953) as Policeman (uncredited)
- Code Two (1953) as Police Sergeant at Roll Call (uncredited)
- The 49th Man (1953) as Commander Jackson
- Remains to Be Seen (1953) as Officer Miller
- A Slight Case of Larceny (1953) as Mr. Logan (uncredited)
- Powder River (1953) as Deputy (uncredited)
- Gentlemen Prefer Blondes (1953) as Passport Official (uncredited)
- Valley of Head Hunters (1953) as Arco (as Robert C. Foulk)
- Overland Pacific (1954) as Railroad Worker (uncredited)
- The Far Country (1954) as Constable Kingman (uncredited)
- East of Eden (1955) as Man at Boxcar (uncredited)
- Blackboard Jungle (1955) as George Katz (uncredited)
- Wyoming Renegades (1955) as Smithy (uncredited)
- Strange Lady in Town (1955) as Joe (uncredited)
- Apache Ambush (1955) as Red Jennings (uncredited)
- Headline Hunters (1955) as Editor of Daily Star (uncredited)
- Rebel Without a Cause (1955) as Gene
- The Spoilers (1955) as Charlie, Bartender
- Carousel (1956) as Second Policeman (uncredited)
- Hot Blood (1956) as Police Sergeant Tim McGrossin (uncredited)
- Backlash (1956) as Sheriff John F. Olson
- Indestructible Man (1956) as Harry – Bar Owner
- The Rawhide Years (1956) as Mate
- The Great Locomotive Chase (1956) as Confederate General Ledbetter (uncredited)
- A Cry in the Night (1956) as Jack – a Jailer (uncredited)
- The Great Man (1956) as Mike Jackson, radio engineer
- Last of the Badmen (1957) as Taylor
- Hold That Hypnotist (1957) as Dr. Simon Noble
- Sierra Stranger (1957) as Tom Simmons
- Untamed Youth (1957) as Sheriff Mitch Bowers
- Johnny Tremain (1957) as Mr. Larkin (uncredited)
- Raintree County (1957) as Pantomimist (uncredited)
- My Man Godfrey (1957) as Motor Cop
- The Tall Stranger (1957) as Pagones
- Day of the Bad Man (1958) as Silas Mordigan, Store Keeper
- Hell's Five Hours (1958) as Jack Fife
- Quantrill's Raiders (1958) as Hager
- The Left Handed Gun (1958) as Sheriff Brady
- Ask Any Girl (1959) as Lieutenant O'Shea (uncredited)
- Go, Johnny Go! (1959) as Policeman
- Born to Be Loved (1959) as Drunk (as Robert C. Foulk)
- Cast a Long Shadow (1959) as Hugh Rigdon
- Ocean's 11 (1960) as Sheriff Wimmer
- Where The Boys Are (1960) as "Elbow Room Bar" Manager (uncredited)
- Swingin' Along (1961) as Piano Mover (uncredited)
- All Hands on Deck (1961) as Naval Inspector (uncredited)
- State Fair (1962) as Mincemeat Judge
- The Wonderful World of the Brothers Grimm (1962) as The Hunter ('The Cobbler and the Elves')
- The Man from the Diners' Club (1963) as Policeman (uncredited)
- Tammy and the Doctor (1963) as Surgeon
- A Ticklish Affair (1963) as Policeman
- Robin and the 7 Hoods (1964) as Sheriff Glick
- Sex and the Single Girl (1964) as Arresting Police Detective (uncredited)
- Once a Thief (1965) as George (uncredited)
- Harlow (1965) as Marvin Silver – Producer (uncredited)
- Lord Love a Duck (1966) as Uniformed Police Sergeant (uncredited)
- The Adventures of Bullwhip Griffin (1967) as Tall Cowboy (uncredited)
- Thoroughly Modern Millie (1967) as Taxi Driver (uncredited)
- Eight on the Lam (1967) as Detective (uncredited)
- Hell on Wheels (1967) as Sutton
- The Impossible Years (1968) as Police Captain (uncredited)
- The Split (1968) as Police Desk Sergeant (uncredited)
- The Love Bug (1968) as Bice
- More Dead Than Alive (1969) as Brill
- The Computer Wore Tennis Shoes (1969) as Police Desk Sergeant (uncredited)
- Flap (1970) as Railroad Yard Foreman (uncredited)
- Vanishing Point (1971) as Colorado Communications Officer (uncredited)
- Skin Game (1971) as Sheriff
- Bunny O'Hare (1971) as Commissioner Dingle
- Emperor of the North (1973) as Conductor
- Win, Place or Steal (1975) as Boardmember
- Pete's Dragon (1977) as Old Sea Captain (final film role)

=== Television ===
- The Lone Ranger, 4 episodes (1952–1955)
- Fireside Theater, 5 episodes (1952–1954)
- I Married Joan, 3 episodes (1953–1955)
- The Loretta Young Show, 13 episodes (1953–1959)
- Stories of the Century, as Sheriff Peter Grimes in "The Dalton Gang" (1954)
- City Detective, as Pearson (1954)
- General Electric Theater, as Bank Guard in "The Face Is Familiar" (1954)
- The George Burns and Gracie Allen Show, 4 episodes as Policeman (1954–1956)
- Gunsmoke, 2 episodes as Fields and Mr. Hinton (1955, 1966)
- The Great Gildersleeve, 2 episodes as Charlie Anderson (1955)
- Alfred Hitchcock Presents (1956) (Season 1 Episode 19: "The Derelicts") as Police Detective Sergeant James Monroney
- Adventures of Superman, as Big Tom Rufus (1956)
- December Bride, 2 episodes, including as Jack Schuyler in "Lily the Matchmaker" (1956)
- The 20th Century Fox Hour, 4 episodes (1955–1957)
- Cheyenne, 4 episodes (1957–1962)
- Circus Boy as Ben Farmer in "The Good Samaritans" (1956)
- The Adventures of Jim Bowie, 2 episodes as Yancey (1956)
- Sheena, Queen of the Jungle, as Gunther (1956)
- The Millionaire, 2 episodes (1956–1957)
- Fury, 2 episodes (1956, 1959)
- Whirlybirds, 2 episodes (1957–1958)
- The Silent Service, as Carroll in "Cargo for Cravelle" (1957)
- Trackdown, as Dan Cutler in "Easton, Texas" (1957)
- The Gray Ghost, as Jeb in "Charity" (1957)
- Broken Arrow, as Hank Woodley in "The Doctor" (1957)
- Tombstone Territory in Season 1 Episode 1 "Gunslinger from Galeyville" (1957)
- Telephone Time, as Orrin Henry in "The Man Who Discovered O. Henry" (1957)
- Tombstone Territory Episode "Ride Out at Noon" (1957)
- Maverick, 3 episodes (1957–1961)
- Man Without a Gun in "Decoy" (1957)
- The Sheriff of Cochise as Hank in "The Relatives" (1957) and under the revised title, U.S. Marshal as Jess Striker in "Deer Hunt" (1959)
- Tales of Wells Fargo, 2 episodes (1957, 1961)
- How to Marry a Millionaire in "Hit and Run" (1958)
- Perry Mason, 4 episodes (1958–1965)
- State Trooper as Jim Granite in "Key to a Killer" (1958)
- Mike Hammer, as Gus Peters in "So That's Who It Was" (1958)
- Union Pacific "Indian Treaty" (1958)
- Richard Diamond, Private Detective as Sal Prince in "Arson" (1958)
- Jefferson Drum, 2 episodes (1958)
- Dick Powell's Zane Grey Theatre, 2 episodes (1958, 1961)
- Wanted: Dead or Alive, as Harkrader in "Eight Cent Reward" (1958)
- 26 Men, 4 episodes (1958–1959)
- The Texan, 3 episodes (1958–1960)
- Colt .45, 3 episodes (1958–1960)
- Lassie, 18 episodes, as Sheriff H. Miller (1958–1962)
- The Restless Gun, as Henry Merser in "The Pawn" (1959)
- The Rebel, as a Sheriff in "The Vagrants" (1959)
- Walt Disney Presents: Texas John Slaughter and The Swamp Fox (1959)
- The Real McCoys, as Vance Ambruster in "Grandpa's Private War" (1959)
- The Rifleman, 5 episodes (1959–1961)
- Bonanza (1960–1968), 13 episodes as Deputy (1960–1968)
- The Man from Blackhawk, as Hoag Lafitte in "The Ghost of Lafitte" (1960)
- Overland Trail, as Mining Camp Leader in "The O'Mara's Ladies" (1960)
- Guestward, Ho!, as a Farmer in "The Hootens Fire Lonesome" (1960)
- Hennesey, as Moose Miller in "The Underfed Fullback" (1960)
- Riverboat, as Captain Smiley in "Trunk Full of Dreams" (1960)
- Bat Masterson, as Judge Pete Perkins in "Welcome to Paradise" (1960)
- The Deputy, 2 episodes (1960–1961)
- Outlaws, as Sonny's Lawyer in "The Daltons Must Die, Part 1" (1961)
- The Tall Man, as Gimp in "Time of Foreshadowing" (1961)
- Adventures in Paradise, as Harris in "Show Me a Hero" (1961)
- Coronado 9 (1961)
- 77 Sunset Strip, as Emil Seley in "The Legend of Leckonby" (1961)
- Hawaiian Eye, as Captain Walker (1961)
- The Untouchables, as a Sheriff (1961)
- Stagecoach West, as Sam Jason in "The Guardian Angels" (1961)
- The Many Loves of Dobie Gillis, as Mr. Callahan in "The Second Childhood of Herbert T. Gillis" (1961)
- Mister Ed, 2 episodes (1961, 1963)
- Frontier Circus, as Logan in "Incident at Pawnee Gun" (1962)
- The Twilight Zone, as Gatekeeper in "The Hunt" (1962)
- The Jack Benny Program, as kidnapper Dick Tracy in "Jack Is Kidnapped" (1963)
- Going My Way, as Sergeant in "Run, Robin, Run" (1963)
- The Beverly Hillbillies, 2 episodes (1963, 1968)
- Temple Houston, as O'Garrick in "Toll the Bell Slowly" (1963)
- Channing, as Otto in "No Wild Games for Sopie" (1963)
- Kraft Suspense Theatre, as Walker (1964) Walker
- Daniel Boone, 2 episodes as Otis and Sledge Clayburn (1964, 1967)
- Lost in Space, episodes as Kraspo and Cragmire (1967–1968)
- A Man Called Shenandoah, as Mit (1965)
- Green Acres, 16 episodes, mostly as Roy Trendell (1966–1971)
- Laredo, as Virgil Porter (1966)
- Mona McCluskey, as Riley (1966)
- The Guns of Will Sonnett, 3 episodes (1967–1968)
- Cimarron Strip, as Ragan (1968)
- Here's Lucy, 4 episodes (1968)
- The Big Valley, as Harry (1968)
- Lancer (1969)
- The Mod Squad, as Sheriff Considine (1970)
- Kung Fu, as Moss (1973)
- The Cowboys, as O.J. Prouty in "A Matter of Honor" (1974)
- Adam-12, as Security guard, 10/29/1974
- Little House on the Prairie, as Peterson (1975)
- Barbary Coast, as Kingsford (1975)
