= The Lady Confesses =

1945 film by Sam Newfield

- Film poster
- Directed by: Sam Newfield
- Written by: Irwin Franklyn (story); Helen Martin (writer)
- Produced by: Alfred Stern (producer)
- Starring: See below
- Cinematography: Jack Greenhalgh
- Edited by: Holbrook N. Todd
- Production company: Alexander Stern Productions
- Distributed by: Producers Releasing Corporation
- Release date: May 16, 1945 (United States)
- Running time: 64 minutes
- Country: United States
- Language: English

The Lady Confesses is a 1945 American film noir directed by Sam Newfield and released by Poverty Row studio Producers Releasing Corporation. It stars Mary Beth Hughes, Hugh Beaumont, and Edmund MacDonald.

The film is in the public domain as it was not renewed following its initial 28-year copyright term.

== Plot ==
While on the verge of being divorced, Norma Craig disappears. Seven years later, when her husband Larry Craig is planning to marry Vicki McGuire, Norma returns and tells Vicki that neither she nor anybody else can marry Larry. After Norma is found dead, both the young woman and her fiancé find themselves mixed up with a crooked nightclub owner, whom the police suspect of the murder.

== Cast ==
- Mary Beth Hughes as Vicki McGuire
- Hugh Beaumont as Larry Craig
- Edmund MacDonald as Lucky Brandon
- Claudia Drake as Lucile Compton
- Emmett Vogan as Police Capt. Brown
- Barbara Slater as Norma Craig
- Edward Howard as Detective Harmon
- Dewey Robinson as Steve
- Carol Andrews as Margie
- Jack George as Apartment House Manager (uncredited)
- Charles King as Beach Cop (uncredited)
- Frank Mayo as Coroner (uncredited)
- Harold Miller as Nightclub Dance Extra (uncredited)
- Jerome Root as Bill (uncredited)

== Soundtrack ==
- "Dance Close To Me, Darling" (Written by Robert Unger and Al Seaman)
- "It's All Your Fault" (Written by Cindy Walker)
- "It's A Fine Old World" (Written by Smith, Kuhstos, and Blonder)

== See also ==
- Presumption of death
