= Harlem Is Heaven =

1932 American film directed by Irwin R. Franklyn

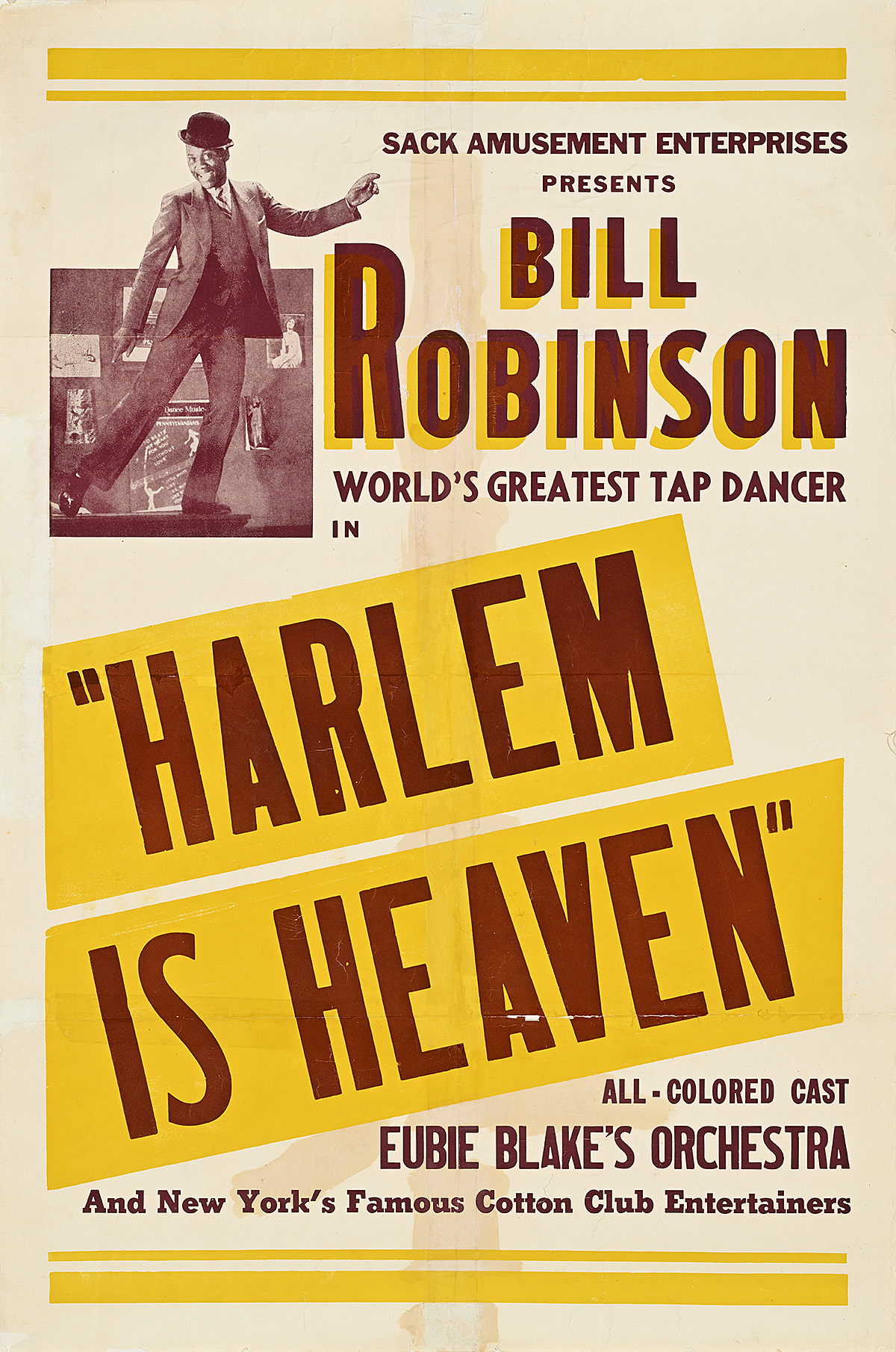
- Poster for the film at the time of its release
- Directed by: Irwin R. Franklyn
- Written by: Irwin R. Franklyn (screenplay)
- Produced by: Irving Yates (uncredited); Tishman & O'Neal (uncredited); Jack Goldberg ("Supervisor")
- Starring: Bill Robinson; James Baskett; Anise Boyer; Henri Wessell
- Cinematography: Charles J. Levine
- Edited by: Elmer J. McGovern at H.E.R. Laboratories
- Music by: Shelton Brooks; Edgar Dorwell; Porter Grainer; Joe Jordan; Eubie Blake and His Orchestra
- Production companies: Lincoln Pictures, Inc., New York, N.Y.
- Distributed by: Lincoln Pictures, Inc.; Sack Amusement Enterprises
- Release date: May 27, 1932
- Running time: 69 minutes (original cut)
- Country: United States
- Language: English
- Budget: Under $50,000

Harlem Is Heaven is a 1932 American pre-Code crime drama musical film directed by Irwin Franklyn and featuring a virtually all African-American cast. Bill "Bojangles" Robinson stars in his first leading role on screen, along with Putney Dandridge, John Mason, and some of the top entertainers of the period from Harlem's famous Cotton Club, including James Baskett, Anise Boyer, Henri Wessell, and Alma Smith. Eubie Blake and his orchestra perform most of the background music and instrumentals during the film's onstage song and dance numbers.

== "The Tree of Hope" ==
Preceding the opening scene of Harlem Is Heaven is a contemporary montage of residents walking and parading on the streets of Harlem, moving images that are accompanied on the screen by a scrolling prologue. Part of that introductory text provides the viewer with a brief history of a special tree in Harlem, an elm that in 1932 still grew next to one of the neighborhood's busy sidewalks:

Many years ago a jobless actor stood by the big tree on 7th Avenue near 131st Street, Harlem, wishing for work. While leaning against this tree he heard that a downtown manager was seeking him for a leading part in a new show. Since then this tree has become a favorite stopping place for unemployed actors. Its legend has spread throughout the country, and it is now famous as "The Tree of Hope".

== Plot ==
One evening on a sidewalk in Harlem, Jean Stratton (Anise Boyer)—a young unemployed actress and dancer from West Virginia—stands next to "The Tree of Hope", openly praying and imploring the legendary tree to help find her work. When she stops one passing man to ask how long she needs to stand under the tree to get a job, a nearby police officer thinks she is a soliciting prostitute, so he arrests her. A group of spectators gather around the officer and Jean, including "Money" Johnson (James Baskett), who gets the officer to release her. Money is a local theater owner widely known in Harlem. He is also a racketeer who specializes in "policy games" or gambling, as well as circulating phony investment schemes around New York as well as in Philadelphia and other cities. After the officer and the onlookers leave, Money offers Jean a job at his Acme Theatre, gives her some cash as an advance on her salary, and tells her to report to his office the next day.

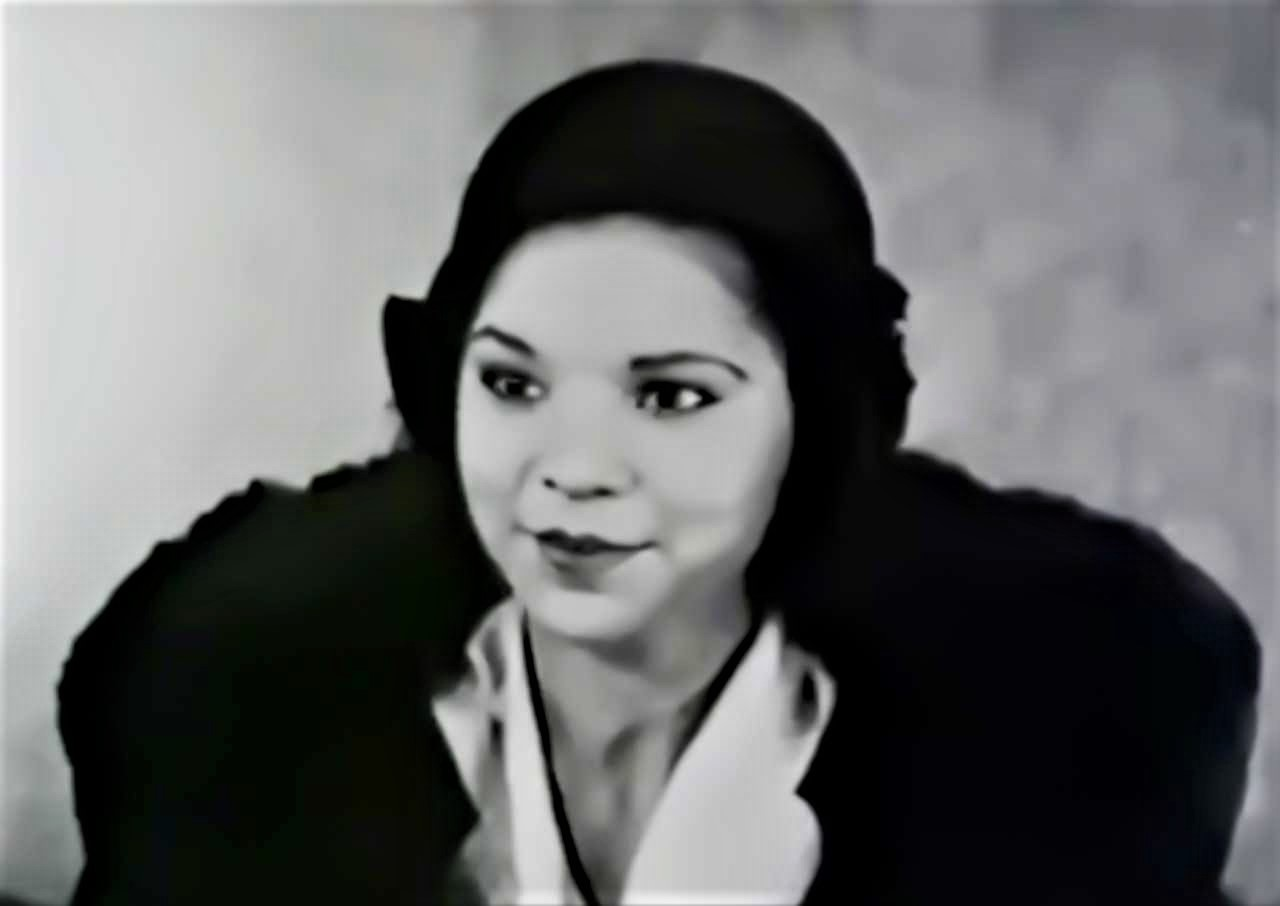
Anise Boyer as Jean Stratton, the film's leading female character

At the appointed time, Jean meets Money, who introduces her to Bill (Bill Robinson), Acme's star performer and director of its dance and other stage productions. There Jean also meets another performer, a handsome young actor and dancer named "Chummy" Walker (Henri Wessell). Both Chummy and Bill are immediately smitten with Jean even though she initially refers to them as her protective "big brothers". Money, however, has his own plans to seduce her. After a stage rehearsal, Money warns Chummy that "Miss Stratton" is more than his protégée, declaring her his "personal and private property". He then orders Chummy to invite Jean to a party at the theater after that evening's show. The party in reality will be set up as an intimate dinner with just Money. Chummy warns Jean of Money's intentions, but she ignores him and goes to the office, where the theater boss forces himself on her. As she struggles to leave, Bill enters the office, a fight ensues, and Bill knocks out Money. The next day Bill and Jean learn they have been fired.

Bill quickly gets a new job performing at a nearby nightclub owned by Knobs Moran (Bob Sawyer), Money's bitter rival in both entertainment and crime. Money now seeks revenge, especially against Chummy for divulging his plan to take advantage of Jean. Money then hatches another plan, one to get Chummy imprisoned. Money enlists him as the front man in marketing a bogus new hair-straightening product. Money is careful in arranging the scam so he is not openly involved, while assuring Chummy that the new product is genuine and will earn huge profits for everyone. Initially successful selling the product, Chummy is soon arrested and jailed for fraud after all the investors lose their money, including Bill's close friend John "Spider" Mason, who had committed most of his life savings to the enterprise.

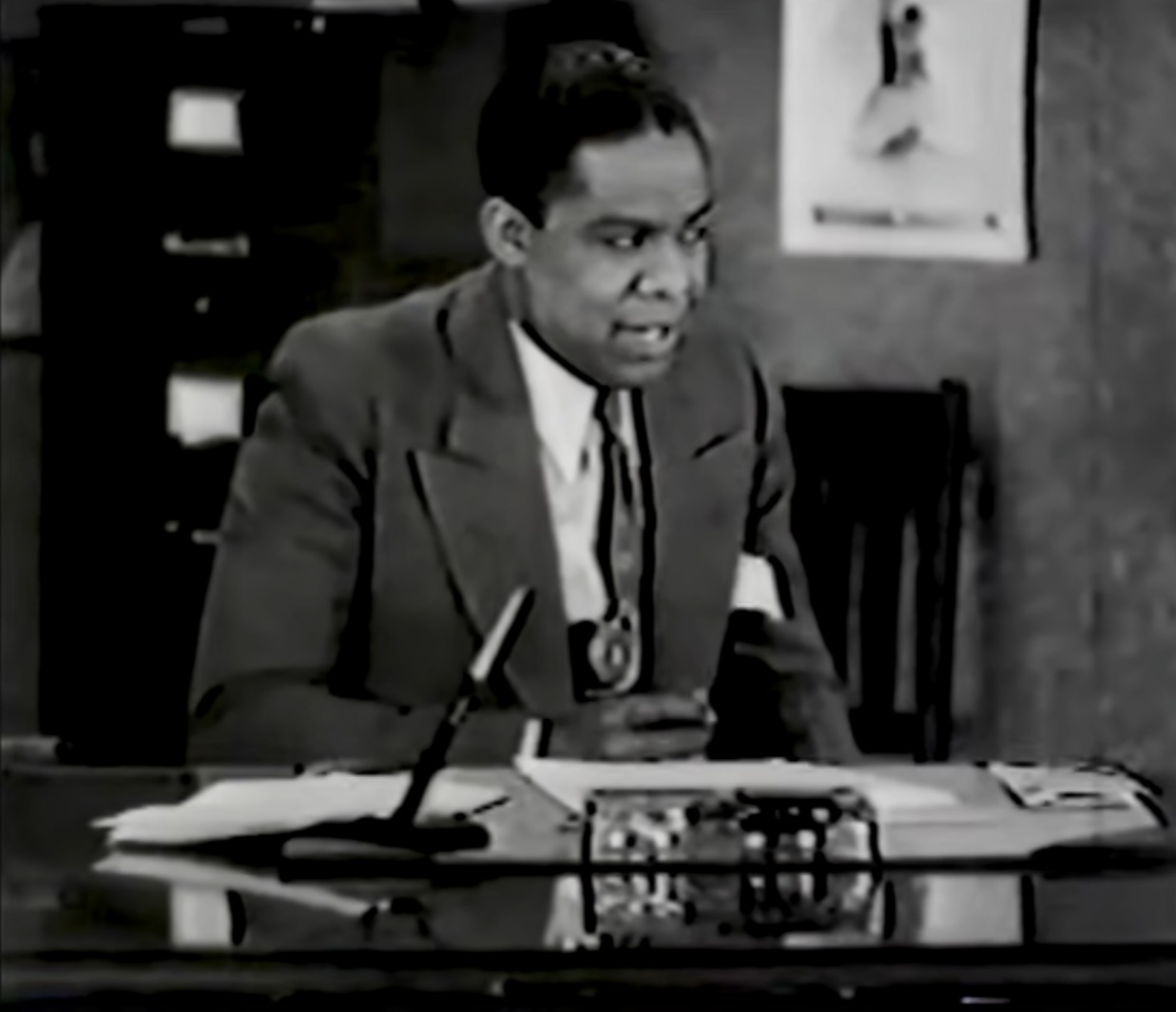
Variety in 1932 described James Baskett's portrayal of "Money" Johnson as "very impressive".

While visiting the police station to see Chummy, Jean learns of Money's role in devising the fraud, so she visits Greta (Alma Smith), one of Money's girlfriends who knows details about the scheme. After a brutal fight with Greta, Jean forces her to provide the district attorney with information proving Money's guilt, which results in Chummy's release from jail. Spider then learns from newspaper reports that it was Money, not Chummy, who had concocted the phony investment. Now seeking his own revenge for the loss of his money, Spider confronts Money in his office. After Money tries to shoot him, Spider uses a razor to kill the crime boss as he pleads for mercy. The story then ends in Bill's apartment, where Bill, his mother visiting from Richmond, Jean, and Chummy have gathered. Earlier, Bill had realized that Jean and Chummy had fallen in love, so he urges them to get married before he cheerfully leaves the apartment to see another friend.

== Cast ==
- Bill Robinson — Himself
- John Mason — "Spider" Mason
- Putney Dandridge — Stage Manager
- Jimmy Baskette — Remus A. "Money" Johnson
- Anise Boyer — Jean Stratton
- Henri Wessell — "Chummy" Walker
- Alma Smith — Greta Rae
- Bob Sawyer — "Knobs" Moran
- Eubie Blake — Himself (and his orchestra)
- Juano Hernandez — Street Cop (uncredited)
- Ferdie Lewis (offscreen credit)
- Myra Johnson (offscreen credit)
- Margaret Jenkins (offscreen credit)
- Jili Smith (offscreen credit)
- "Slick" Chester (offscreen credit)
- Thomas Moseley (offscreen credit)
- George Nagel (offscreen credit)
- Naomi Price (offscreen credit)
- Jackie Young (offscreen credit)

== Production notes ==
- Before its release in 1932, the film was issued a tentative review certification number—02816—by the Motion Picture Producers and Distributors of America "pending the production company's adherence to the Hays Office's demands regarding specific changes in the script."
- The title card in the film's opening credits notes a 1932 copyright for the production; however, both the American Film Institute (AFI) and Turner Classic Movies (TCM) state that "no indication of the film's registration for copyright has been found."
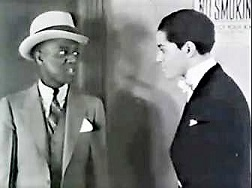
  Bill Robinson (left) as himself and Henri Wessell as "Chummy" Walker
- In the film's opening credits, "'The Cotton Club', Harlem" is also acknowledged for permitting "By Special Arrangement" the participation of "Jimmy Baskette", Anise Boyer, Henri Wessell, Alma Smith, and Bob Sawyer in the production.
- With a budget reportedly under $50,000, Harlem Is Heaven was filmed in just one week at the Ideal Studios in Hudson Heights, New Jersey, and on location at the stages of several theaters, including the Ideal Theater in Philadelphia and the R.K.O. Kenmore Theater in Brooklyn.
- African-American actors, dancers, musicians, and supporting players comprise nearly the film's entire cast, although there is an uncredited white actor with a speaking part, who portrays a district attorney. There are also white extras portraying peripheral characters, including an assistant to the district attorney and an attending officer at a police station.
- During its production, the film was identified by the alternate or working title Harlem Rhapsody.
- The film's romance-and-crime storyline is interwoven with solo tap-dance and singing performances by Bill Robinson, as well as chorus line productions and other group stage acts in rehearsals. During one scene in a neighborhood bar, Robinson sings a rendition of "Is You Is or Is You Ain't". Accompanying him at the piano and reciting lyrics in the "speak set" is jazz pianist and vocalist Putney Dandridge, although in its 1932 review of the film Variety misidentifies Dandridge as Eubie Blake.
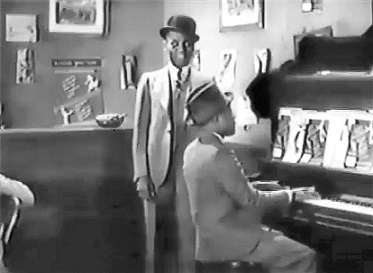
  Bill Robinson singing "Is You or Is You Ain't" with Putney Dandridge on piano
- Bill Robinson, who was 54 years old when the film was released, demonstrates his remarkable talents and agility as a dancer, especially in one solo number. Tap dancing to the tune of "Swanee River", he playfully and repeatedly moves up and down a set of portable prop stairs. Later, in 1935, he would perform a simplified version of this famous "stair step" routine with child star Shirley Temple in the MGM production The Little Colonel.
- The film also marks James Baskett's screen debut as an actor, featuring him as the character "Remus A. Johnson". Fourteen years after his work on this production, Baskett would receive national fame for his portrayal of the controversial character "Uncle Remus" in Walt Disney's 1946 live-action animated musical film Song of the South.

== Reception ==
In 1932, according to the widely read New York-based trade paper Variety, the film made over $4,000 during its opening week at just the Renaissance Theater in Harlem. That financial success led to its run being extended there. Variety in its June 7 edition also provides a lengthy assessment of the production. In its review the paper recommends the film's presentation to both white and black audiences, recognizes the drawing power of Bill Robinson at the box office, and finds Robinson and Baskett's performances to be the strongest elements of the quickly made, low-budget production:

'Harlem Is Heaven' has one strong point in its favor—it's different. One theory the public is clamoring for anything that varies the steadiness of their film diet, theatres are now generally welcoming anything off the beaten track. This inexpensively-made talker with an all-colored cast, might fill the bill...Strictly on merit, not holding a candle to Hollywood-made product, 'Harlem Is Heaven,' however, has the odds in its favor as a money-maker in many respects. It stars Bill Robinson, tap dancer, standard in vaude and colored shows. Where that name and artist's work is known, which takes in every key in the country, there is a certain general draw to be expected through the Robinson name...Bill Robinson's personality stands out boldly. He's more than an actor here than a dancer, though the hoofing, including the stair routine, is not at all missing in both evidence and appeal...Robinson with his very definite personality tops the other members of the cast by a mile...Though his voice is not always audible, Jimmy Baskette is a very impressive type as the Harlem producer-racketeer heavy.

In a more recent assessment of the film, in 2011, The World Cinema Review pans its storyline and acting but extols the dance and musical performances, especially those by Robinson:

Franklin's all Black 1932 movie Harlem is Heaven is a disaster of story and acting, with an absolutely remarkable cast, nonetheless, of musicians and dancers, including Bill ["Bojangles"] Robinson and Eubie Blake and his Orchestra. Robinson is the center of this piece and does numerous numbers throughout, all of them brilliant. But the best of most famous dance, the "Step Dance", stands out as one of his most memorable dances of all time... Robinson displays little of the athleticism of the marvelous [Nicholas] brothers, but his grace and lithe moves cannot be matched. It's as if this energized movement [were] a simple warm-up for something else—a leap across drums as he performs in the "Drum Dance" or the slip and slides of the marvelous sand dance of Stormy Weather. But there is something so abstract and pure about his "Step Dance," that, in my estimation, it can’t be matched.
