= The Woman from Tangier =

1948 film

- Directed by: Harold Daniels
- Written by: Irwin Franklyn
- Produced by: Martin Mooney
- Starring: Adele Jergens; Stephen Dunne; Ian MacDonald; Donna Martell
- Cinematography: Henry Freulich
- Edited by: Richard Fantl
- Music by: Mischa Bakaleinikoff
- Production company: Columbia Pictures
- Distributed by: Columbia Pictures
- Release date: 12 February 1948
- Running time: 66 minutes
- Country: United States
- Language: English

The Woman from Tangier is a 1948 American crime thriller film directed by Harold Daniels and starring Adele Jergens, Stephen Dunne and Ian MacDonald. It was one of a number of Hollywood films set in Tangier during the International Zone era. The film's art direction was by Walter Holscher.

== Plot ==
A dancer known to everyone by the name Nylon has been working in Morocco at a somewhat disreputable nightclub owned by Paul Morales, who gets into some trouble with police. Nylon decides to set sail for Gibraltar on the North Empress, which docks along the way in Tangier.

Tens of thousands of dollars are reported missing from the ship's safe. Capt. Sam Graves also is notified that the ship's purser has been found murdered. Insurance investigator Ray Shapley tries to piece together what happened, and after he questions Nylon, a romantic attraction between them develops.

Morales turns up aboard ship. He reveals to Nylon that he was responsible for the theft and murder, along with his accomplice, Graves, the ship's captain. Graves is persuaded that Nylon knows too much and must be done away with, but Shapley rescues her just in time.

== Cast ==
- Adele Jergens as Nylon
- Stephen Dunne as Ray Shapley
- Ian MacDonald as Paul Morales
- Donna Martell as Flo-Flo
- Denis Green as Capt. Graves
- Robert Tafur as Prefect of Police
- Michael Duane as Ned Pankin
- Curt Bois as Parquit
- Anton Kosta as LeDeux
- Ivan Triesault as Rocheau
- Maurice Marsac as Martine
- Art Dupuis as Gendarme
- George J. Lewis as Albert Franz - the Pilot

== Bibliography ==
- Edwards, Brian T. Morocco Bound: Disorienting America’s Maghreb, from Casablanca to the Marrakech Express. Duke University Press, 7 Oct 2005.
