= Three Smart Saps =

1942 American short film by Jules White

- Directed by: Jules White
- Written by: Clyde Bruckman
- Produced by: Del Lord; Hugh McCollum
- Starring: Moe Howard; Larry Fine; Curly Howard; Bud Jamison; Barbara Slater; John Tyrrell
- Cinematography: Benjamin H. Kline
- Edited by: Jerome Thoms
- Distributed by: Columbia Pictures
- Release date: July 30, 1942 (U.S.)
- Running time: 16:40
- Country: United States
- Language: English

Three Smart Saps is a 1942 short subject directed by Jules White starring American slapstick comedy team The Three Stooges (Moe Howard, Larry Fine and Curly Howard). It is the 64th entry in the series released by Columbia Pictures starring the comedians, who released 190 shorts for the studio between 1934 and 1959.

== Plot ==
On the day they are to marry three sisters, the Stooges learn that their prospective father-in-law, a jail warden, has fallen victim to the machinations of a criminal gang that has taken control of the jail and incarcerated him. The Stooges resolve to liberate him. They decide to get themselves arrested in order to infiltrate the confines of the jail.

After two bungled attempts to be arrested, they break into the jail and successfully locate warden Stevens, their intended patriarch. He advises them to clandestinely photograph the activities of the criminal gang, thereby securing evidence essential for their downfall and Stevens's vindication. The trio gain entry to a dance that is in progress within the jail. While Curly dances a rumba that causes his poorly stitched suit to fall apart, Moe circulates among the partying criminals and secures the needed photographs.

Through their concerted efforts, justice prevails as the perpetrators are apprehended, paving the way for the restoration of order within the jail. Stevens is reinstated as warden, ensuring the fulfillment of the Stooges' romantic aspirations as they unite with their beloveds in matrimony.

== Cast ==
- Moe Howard as Moe
- Larry Fine as Larry
- Curly Howard as Curly
- Bud Jamison as Party Guest
- Barbara Slater as Curly's Dancing Partner
- John Tyrell as Warden Stevens

== Production notes ==
Three Smart Saps was filmed on April 7–10, 1942. This is the seventh of sixteen Stooge shorts with the word "three" in the title. The film's title is a play on the 1936 musical comedy film Three Smart Girls.

The mobster party in prison is decorated with college-sports-style banners for Alcatraz, Joliet, Leavenworth and Sing Sing, all well-known prisons of the day.

The sequence depicting Curly's suit unraveling at the seams while he dances is reminiscent of a routine employed in Harold Lloyd's 1925 film The Freshman. Although Clyde Bruckman, the writer associated with this comedic sequence, did not contribute to Lloyd's film, he is credited with potentially drawing inspiration from it for this particular gag.
