= Rae Samuels =

American vaudeville actress (1887 – 1979)

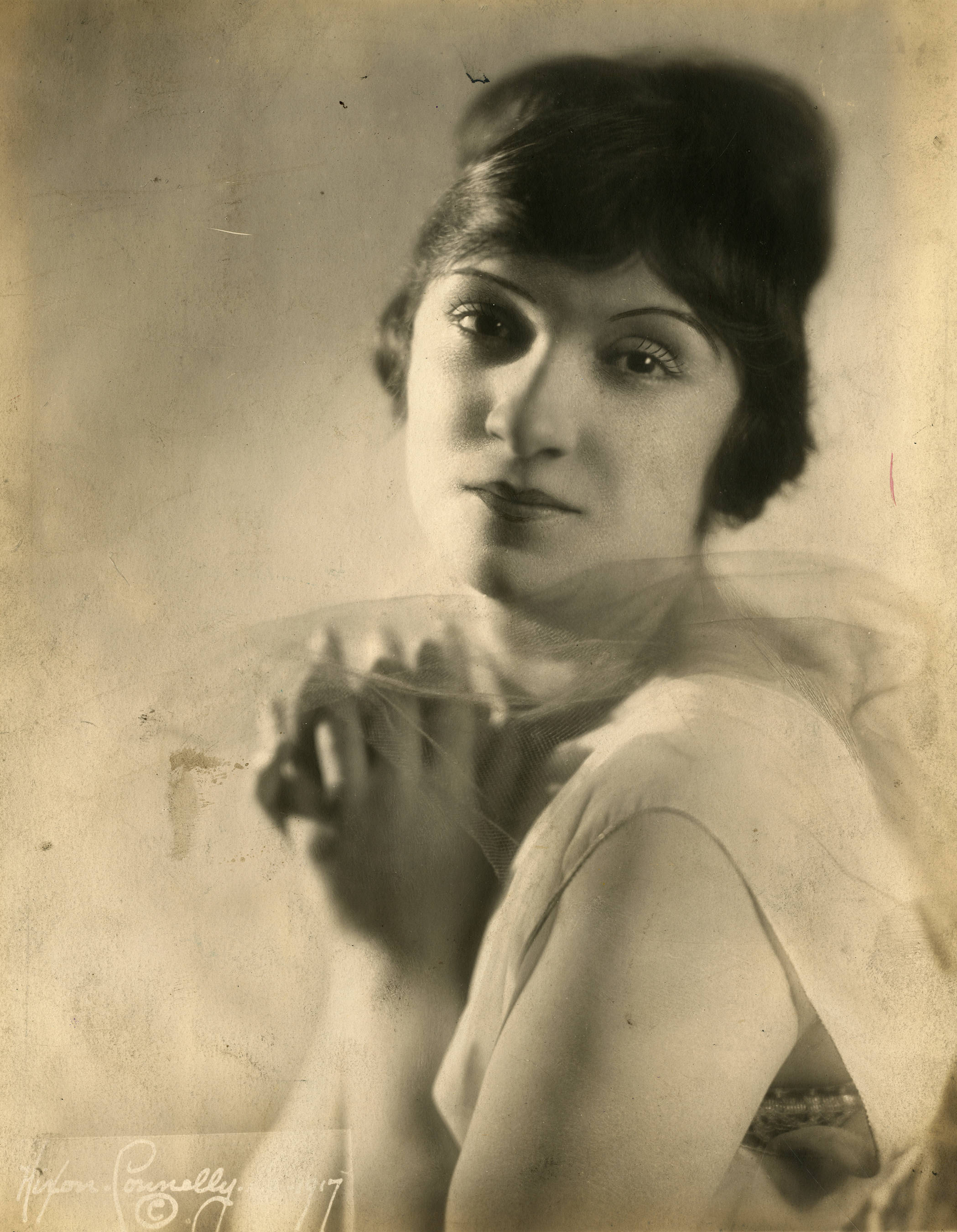
- 1919 publicity photo
- Born: Rachel May Samuels; May 3, 1887; Youngstown, Ohio, U.S.
- Died: October 24, 1979 (aged 92); Mahwah, New Jersey, U.S.
- Occupation: Vaudeville entertainer
- Years active: c. 1900–1935

Rachel May "Rae" Samuels (May 3, 1887 – October 24, 1979) was an American vaudeville entertainer, known as "The Blue Streak of Vaudeville".

== Life and career ==
Samuels was born in Youngstown, Ohio, one of ten children, and began performing on stage as a child, winning an amateur talent contest at the age of 13. She performed in her teens with family members in an act called "Musical Hearts", and was spotted by a talent agent. In about 1905, she was persuaded to become a solo performer.

She settled in Chicago, and established herself on the Orpheum Circuit. In San Francisco in 1907, she met boxing manager and promoter Marty Forkins, who became her manager. On Samuels's recommendation, Forkins then began to act as agent for dancer Bill "Bojangles" Robinson, and over the following decades helped to establish Robinson as the best-paid black entertainer in the United States. Official records indicate that Samuels and Forkins married in 1914, though they later claimed to have married in 1911.

Samuels appeared in the Ziegfeld Follies of 1912. An "exuberant" performer, she became one of the most popular and successful stars of the period as a singer and comedienne. She was billed as "The Blue Streak of Vaudeville", the phrase suggesting a liking for "racy" songs as well as highlighting her ability to change styles between one part of her act to another — such as changing from elegant evening wear to rustic character costumes, and "performing zippy character routines, including songs, for each one." She performed in front of a blue backdrop with a lightning bolt. She was described as "a peppy performer... who packed a mixture of dialect songs, novelty numbers and comical anecdotes into a fast-paced act that kept her audience in stitches."

Her songs included Irving Berlin's "Oh! How I Hate to Get Up in the Morning", which she introduced in 1918, to acclaim from her military audience. However, she did not record her songs, and they were generally not sheet music hits, because they relied on her personal presentation style in performance. She continued to be a star attraction in vaudeville shows through the 1920s. In 1932, she appeared in publicity photographs shortly before the repeal of Prohibition, holding the last bottle of Schlitz beer that had been produced before the legislation came into force. The following year, she appeared in her only movie, The Big Benefit, which starred Bill Robinson and in which Samuels sang one song, "Poppa’s Back With Momma Now".

She continued to make occasional stage appearances until 1935. She lived privately thereafter. Her husband, Marty Forkins, died in 1966. Rae Samuels died in Mahwah, New Jersey in 1979 at the age of 92.
