= Barbara Slater (actress) =

American actress (1920–1997)

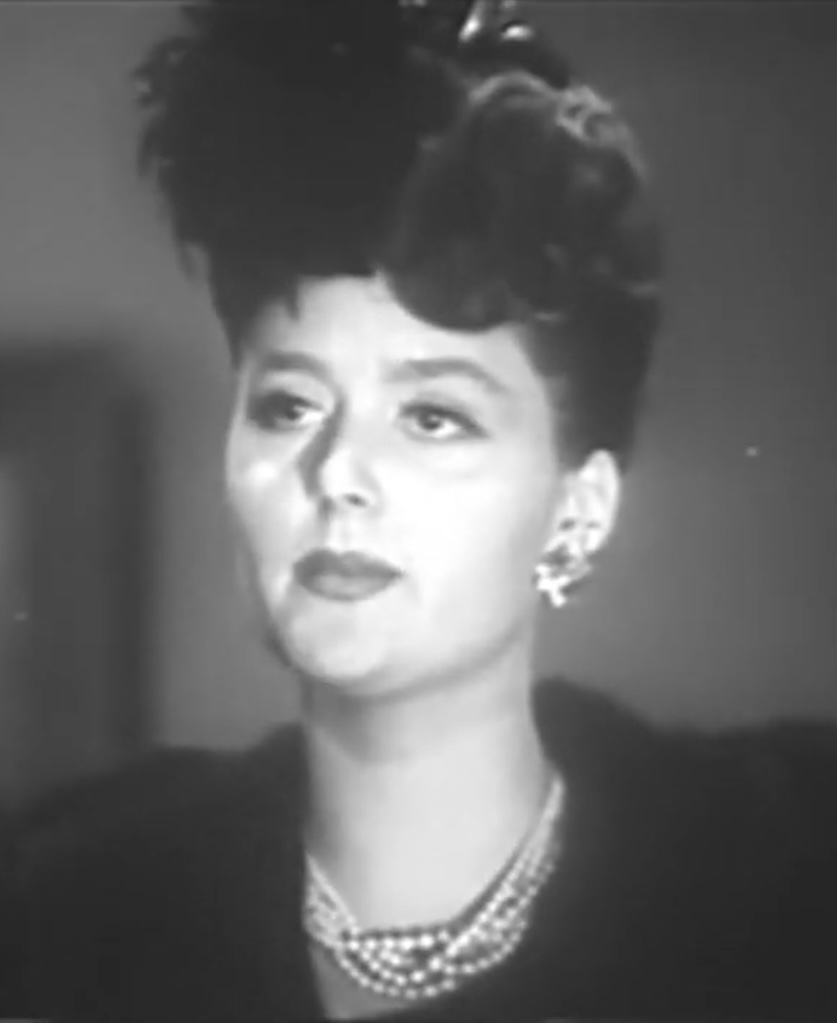
- Slater in The Lady Confesses (1945)
- Born: December 17, 1920; New York City, U.S.
- Died: October 14, 1997 (aged 76); Green Valley, Arizona, U.S.
- Resting place: Green Hills Memorial Park, Rancho Palos Verdes, California
- Occupation: Actress
- Years active: 1941–1947
- Spouses: Robert Foulk (m. 1947; died 1989): Charles Sims

Barbara Slater (December 17, 1920 – October 14, 1997) was an American film actress. She appeared in over 20 films between 1941 and 1947.

== Early years ==
Slater's father was Edward Slater, who was described in a 1942 newspaper article as a "celebrated painter", and her mother was an actress. Slater's education came in Switzerland.

== Career ==
Slater initially had a contract with Paramount, but she received her release after a year and began working for other studios.

Modern viewers will recognize Slater for her roles in two Three Stooges films from the 1940s. She was the rumba dancing partner of Curly Howard in Three Smart Saps. Standing nearly six feet tall, Slater towers over the short Stooge, and then manages to tear off his trousers, thanks to the pants being loosely basted. Slater also appeared as Lulu Quackenbush in Half-Wits Holiday, with Curly eating her lipstick, thinking it is edible.

Slater also appears in Charlie Chaplin's Monsieur Verdoux, as the florist who eavesdrops on Monsieur Verdoux's telephone seduction of his next intended victim.

In addition to her film work, Slater was a model at the John Robert Powers Agency in the early 1940s.

== Personal life ==
Slater left Hollywood in 1947, and married character actor Robert Foulk on July 3 of that year. They were married until his death in 1989. Slater was later married to Charles Sims until her death on October 14, 1997. She was buried at Green Hills Memorial Park in Rancho Palos Verdes, California.
