= National Tap Dance Day =

Annual U.S. celebration of tap dance

National Tap Dance Day is observed annually in the United States on May 25 and celebrates tap dance as an American art form. The idea of National Tap Dance Day was first presented to the U.S. Congress on February 7, 1989, and was signed into law by President George H. W. Bush on November 8, 1989. The one-time official observance was on May 25, 1989.

Beyond the United States, particularly in Japan, Australia, India, and Iceland, there are annual Tap Dance Day celebrations. The day can also be celebrated online with 27,518,521 social media mentions in 2016. Some individuals also celebrate independently due to geographical dispersion or lacking access to the wider tap community.

National Tap Dance Day can be celebrated in different ways. One instance, a studio can send dancers onto the streets to teach the Shim Sham Shimmy, a popular tap dance sequence, to passersby. Several cities, especially in the United States, have their own performances and events to coincide with Tap Dance Day.
