= Walter L. Gordon Jr. =

African-American attorney (1908–2012)

Walter L. Gordon Jr. (1908–2012) was an American attorney. He was a pioneering African-American attorney in Los Angeles.

He began his career at a time when there were only 30 African-American attorneys practicing in California. He often represented Billie Holiday.
