= Shakespearean dance =

Dancing in the time and plays of William Shakespeare and his contemporaries

Shakespearean dance refers to dancing in the time and plays of William Shakespeare and his contemporaries.

== Overview ==
There are references to dances such as the galliard or sinkapace, volta, coranto, pavane, and canario, and stage directions indicate dancing in many plays including Romeo and Juliet, Much Ado About Nothing, Twelfth Night, or What You Will, Macbeth, and As You Like It. Terms like 'measure' and 'foot it' can also refer to dancing, and dance is often woven into the plot as part of a masque or masquerade ball, especially in plays by John Marston.

== Primary sources ==
There is no known dancing instruction manual for English dances of Shakespeare's time, but there are descriptions of almains and the measures in the Inns of Court manuscripts (see Payne), mentions of Morris dance in church court and civic records (see Forrest), and large sections of dancing in court masques (see Ravelhofer and Welsford). Other dances referred to in English Renaissance plays such as the galliard, pavane, and volta are described in French and Italian dancing manuals by Thoinot Arbeau and Fabritio Caroso among others. Some of the country dances Shakespeare mentions appear in John Playford's The English Dancing Master (1651), but Playford's choreographies probably differ from the versions performed on the Shakespearean stage.

Jigs often followed performances of plays in late sixteenth- and early seventeenth-century England, but we know very little about the actual steps of this dance (see Baskerville).

== Dances mentioned in Shakespeare plays ==
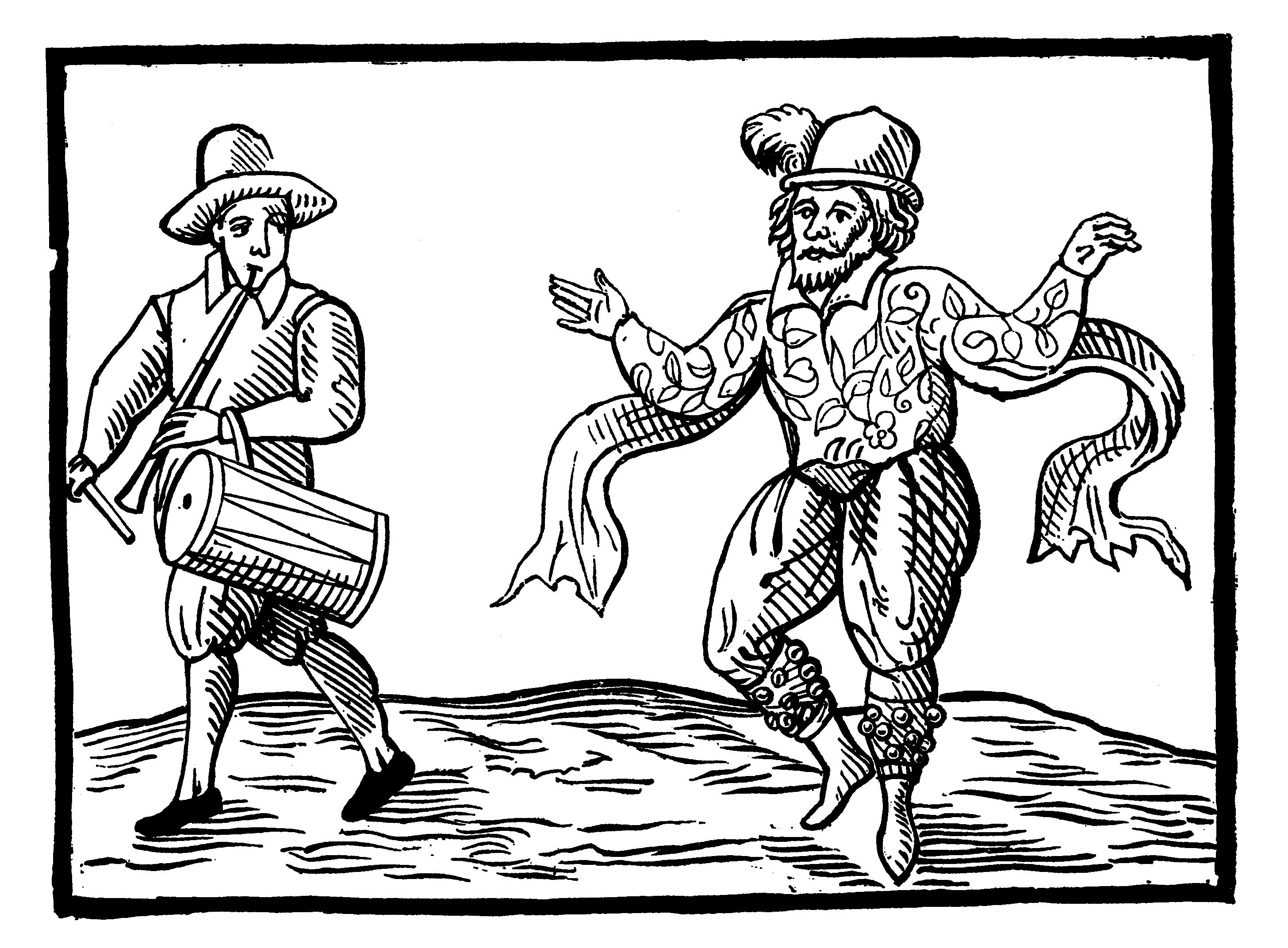
Will Kemp, the Elizabethan Clown, dancing a Jig

- Volta – Troilus and Cressida (Act IV, scene 4), Henry V (Act III, scene 5)
- Coranto – All's Well That Ends Well (Act II, scene 3), Twelfth Night (Act I, scene 3)
- Galliard, cinquepace, or sinkapace – Twelfth Night (Act I, scene 3), Much Ado About Nothing (Act II, scene 1), Henry V (Act I, scene 2)
- Measure, measures, or old measures – As You Like It (Act V, scene 4), Richard II (Act III, scene 4), Much Ado About Nothing (Act II, scene 1)
- Jig – Love's Labour's Lost (Act III, scene 1), Much Ado About Nothing (Act II, scene 1)
- Country footing – The Tempest (Act IV, scene 1)
- Canario – All's Well That Ends Well (Act II, scene 1)

== See also ==
- Early dance
- Elizabethan theatre
- English Renaissance
- Historical dance
- History of dance
- Renaissance dance
- Renaissance music
