= Barford, Norfolk =

Village in Norfolk, England

Coordinates: 52.624°N 1.123°E

Barford
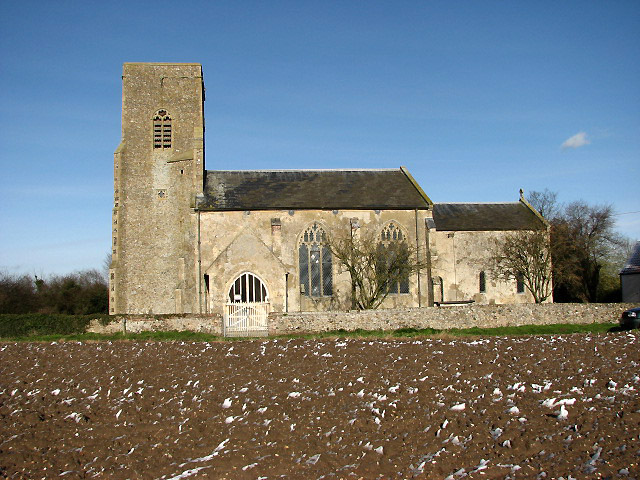
- St Botolph's Church, Barford

- Location within Norfolk
- Area: 4.38 km^{2} (1.69 sq mi)
- Population: 547 (2011)
  - Density: 125/km^{2} (320/sq mi)
- OS grid reference: TG115075
- Civil parish: Barford
- District: South Norfolk
- Shire county: Norfolk
- Region: East
- Country: England
- Sovereign state: United Kingdom
- Post town: NORWICH
- Postcode district: NR9
- Police: Norfolk
- Fire: Norfolk
- Ambulance: East of England
- UK Parliament: Mid Norfolk

Barford is a village and civil parish in the English county of Norfolk, 4 miles (6.4 km) north of Wymondham and 8 miles (13 km) west of Norwich.

The villages name derives from 'bere-ford' meaning 'barley ford'.

The civil parish has an area of 4.38 square kilometres (1.69 sq mi) and in the 2001 census had a population of 508 in 201 households, the population increasing to 547 at the 2011 census. For the purposes of local government, the parish falls within the district of South Norfolk.

In 1600, William Kempe passed through "Barford Bridge" on his Nine Daies Wonder during which he morris danced from London to Norwich.
