= Kempes Nine Daies Wonder =

1600 English pamphlet by William Kempe

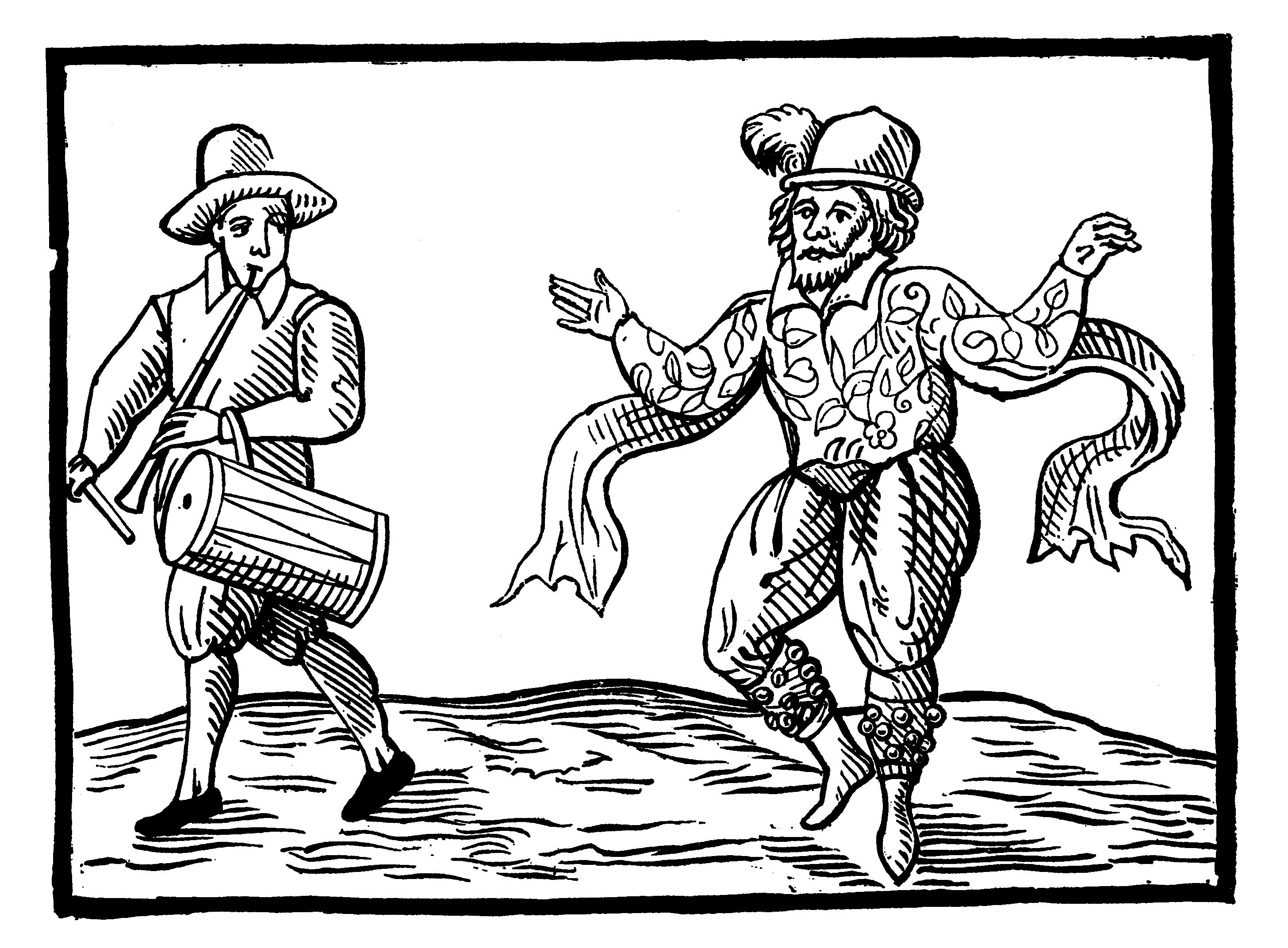
The woodcut on the cover of the Kempes Nine Daies Wonder pamphlet, depicting a drummer and Kempe himself, the only known depiction of him to survive.

Kempes Nine Daies Wonder. Performed in a daunce from London to Norwich is a semi-fictional autobiographical pamphlet by English actor and dancer William Kempe which documents his journey from London to Norwich in February and March that year, printed in 1600 by Edward Allde for the bookseller Nicholas Ling. For this 27-day journey, Kempe morris danced for nine days, spending the rest of the time as an honoured guest in towns along the way which included Bow, Ilford, Brentwood, Chelmsford, Sudbury, Bury St Edmunds and Thetford.

The pamphlet, of which there is only one extant copy, is the only piece of writing that can be safely credited to Kempe, and additionally harbours the only confirmed contemporary image of Kempe to exist. Though Kempe did make the journey from London to Norwich, the pamphlet is closer to a piece of fiction that intends to advertise Kempe and is not a factual historical account of events.

== Background ==
Will Kempe is perhaps best known for his appearances in plays by William Shakespeare, particularly as Dogberry in Much Ado About Nothing and Touchstone in As You Like It. He was one of the Shakespearean theater'’s most famous clowns, and was a master of the jig. He was, however, replaced in this form of role by the less exaggerative and knavish though more verbally and conceptually dexterous Robert Armin in 1599. That year, he left the Chamberlain's Men; Little is reliably known what caused Kemp's resignation, though it is portrayed as a primary reason for Kemp's journey the next year. A natural progression from this for Kempe appears to have been seeking a new economic venture that would be in keeping with his abilities as a clown, seeking immediate monetary returns and personal recognition that he could capitalise on later in his career. He also sought to regain the favour of Queen Elizabeth following his leaving The Chamberlain’s Men.

== Narrative ==
Nine Daies Wonder is semi-fictional. Though the journey did take place and Nine Daies Wonder purports that it is a historical account of Kempe's performance, academics such as Peter Parolin have stated that the pamphlet should not be accepted as documentary history, because it works as an advertisement for Kempe himself, operating as a carefully crafted narrative. There is no way to confirm the story that the pamphlet presents, as the accounts of Kemp's contemporaries are also primarily fictional. The dance itself was also a self-promotional stunt that would help him earn money and enhance his career, with Kempe inviting spectators to gamble on his failure.

=== Dedication to Mary Fitton ===
The pamphlet begins with a dedicatory epistle to Anne (Mary) Fitton, which reads, "his most bountifull Mistris, the Mistris Anne Fitton, Mayde of Honour to the most sacred Mayde Royall Queene Elizabeth". He also makes the claim that some balladeers have misrepresented his morris in their writings.

=== Journey from London to Norwich ===
Kempe's journey as written in the pamphlet lasted 27 days with 9 days of actual dancing and the rest as an honoured guest in towns along the way. This was a journey of over 100 miles. To ensure he would not cheat, he was accompanied by a "controller". Morris dancing is an active dance that features technically demanding jumps, kicks, and stamps. Kempe's form of the morris along the journey, separate from the usual form of morris dance with multiple choreographed dancers, was intended as a solo dance with only Kempe dancing. On the way, he visits Bow, Ilford, Romford, Brentwood ("Burntwood"), Chelmsford, Braintree, Sudbury, Melford, Bury St Edmunds, Thetford, Rocklands, Hingham, and Barford Bridge. He undergoes muddy roadways, exposure to the elements, physical exhaustion, and injury.

==== London ====
The journey began in London "on the first munday of cleane lent", which corresponds to 10 or 11 in February 1600. This positioned his pamphlet to present the journey as a festive bridge over the general austerity of Lent, in anticipation of May Day to which morris dancing was central, particularly because morris was usually prohibited during lent. On the first day of his dance, crowds accompany him out of London, which he writes is "perhappes to make themselves merry, if I should chance (as many thought) to give over my Morrice within a mile of Mile-end".

In Bow, Kempe is greeted with holiday festivity, writing that "I rested a while from dancing, but had small rest with those that would have urg'd me to drink". He is similarly greeted with festivity in Ilford; "I [...] was by the people of the towne and countrey there-about [...] offred carowses in the great spoon").

==== Essex ====
He reaches Brentwood ("Burntwood") by the second day of his dance. Here, two of the people who had followed him through London are arrested as pickpockets. He states his knowledge that they are thieves, though denies their acquaintance and testifies against them, after almost being accused of being an accomplice to the crime. Kempe remarks about the "many Gentlemen and Gentlewomen" that have come to see him.

Arriving at Chelmsford which he reaches by the third day, almost 33 miles from London, he becomes tired and locks himself in his room. He speaks to the people from the window rather than dancing, telling the crowd, "to deale plainely I was so weary, that I could dance no more". Also in Chelmsford, one "Mayde not passing fourteene yeares of age" requests that he dance with her; he dresses her in bells and, upon her request, a complete morris dancer's costume. She is stated to have danced with him for an hour and to have praised him, saying that he "would haue challenged the strongest man in Chelmsford, and amongst many I thinke few would haue done so much".

Leaving Chelmsford, he meets "vnknowne friends" on the way to Braintree on the fourth day. They intend to accompany him to Sudbury which is almost 59 miles from London, though he leaves them behind after they fail to jump "a broad plash of water and mud".

==== Suffolk ====
He is joined by a butcher that Kempe describes as "a lusty, tall fellow", who intends to dance with him the 15 miles from Sudbury to Bury, though quits after half a mile, leaving in the middle of a field and returning to his business. Kempe mocks the butcher stating that he his own "pace in dauncing is not ordinary". As they part, a woman described as "a lusty Country lasse", who mocks the butcher as a "faint hearted lout", challenges Kempe to another dance after seeing the butcher fail. They dance together; Kempe writes that she "shooke her fat sides: and footed it merrily to Melfoord, being a long myle", noting that he is impressed by her ability to keep up with him as well as her dancing skills. He also calls her "my merry Maydemarian". After this dance, Kempe gives her drink and pays her "an English crowne to buy more drinke, for good wench she was in a pittious heate".

In Bury, a wealthy widow, whom he describes as "the widdow Eueret", hosts a large community gathering to honour him at her house, attended by about 30 gentlemen. Kempe describes Everet as "a woman of good presence: and if a foole may iudge, of no smal discretion". From Bury to Thetford, Kempe recounts in the pamphlet that he has danced ten miles in three hours, claiming that since "so light was my heeles, that I counted the ten mile non better than a leape".

==== Norfolk ====
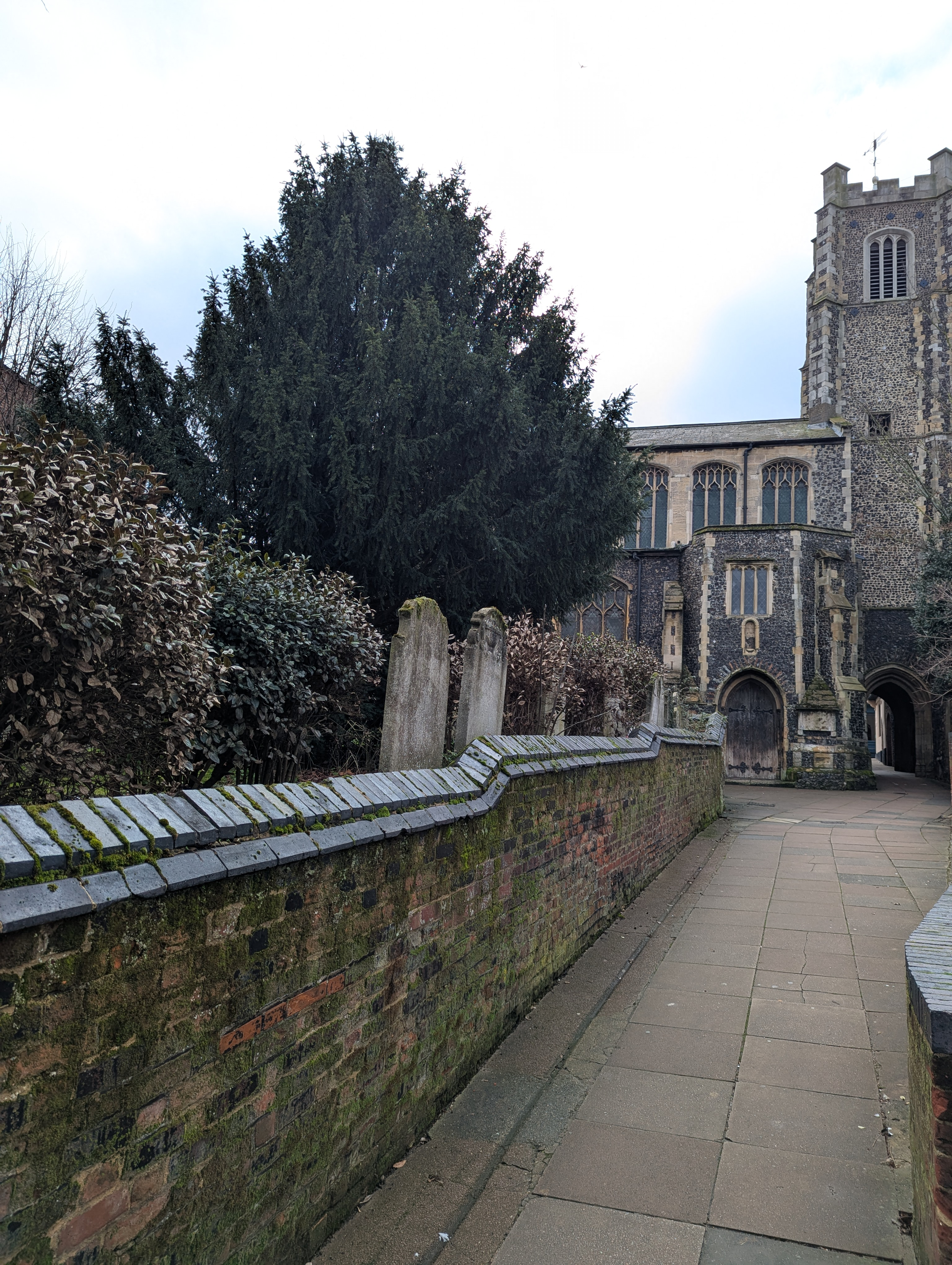
On reaching Norwich, Kempe allegedly jumped the wall of the churchyard of St John Maddermarket.

He is celebrated in Thetford ("great numbers to see mee. [...] Sir Edwin Rich, gave me entertainment in [...] bountifull and liberal sort"). The host of an inn at the Rocklands is written to have said he is "euen as welcome […] as the Queenes best grey-hound". On the way to Barford Bridge from Hingham, he leaves five men behind as "my pace was not for footemen".

On 8 March, upon his final arrival at the gates of Norwich, one Thomas Gilbert recites to him an apparent Shakespearean sonnet titled "Master Kemp his welcome to Norwich". In Norwich, he is received by "divers knights and Gentlemen, together with their wives and Children". Here, a young girl gets too close to him while watching, and he humiliates her by accidentally stepping on her skirt, thereby removing her petticoat and revealing her smock; she struggles to recover the petticoat from "unrulie boies". Kempe jumps over a wall for a meeting with the mayor, avoiding the crowd that has gathered to celebrate him. He nails his shoes up on a building.

On his way back to London, Kemp did not manage to collect his money, arriving back as equally poor as he left. At the end of the pamphlet, Kempe appears to suggest that he will leave London again, writing that, "I William Kemp [...] am shortly God willing to set forward as merily as I may; whether I my selfe know not." He hints that he will leave for Italy, though scholars cannot agree on whether this actually took place.

=== Epilogue ===
The epilogue to the pamphlet makes remarks against "the impudent generation of ballad-makers and their coherents". He again addresses Anne Fitton, assuring her that "all my mirths (meane though they be) haue bin & euer shal be imploi'd to the delight of my royal Mistris".

== Portrayal of Kempe ==
While some academics argue that Kempe does not aggrandise himself in the pamphlet, referring to himself simply as "Will Kemp" rather than "Master Kempe", others such as Fabio Ciambella argue that "self-congratulation and false modesty" often emerges and that he goes as far to belittle others. He frequently touts his skill at jumping and leaping and thus his dancing ability as a man. His portrayal of the challenges he meets are reminiscent of those by John Taylor, Robert Ferris, Gervase Markham, and William Bush. Kempe draws from medieval legends to associate himself with figures such as Robin Hood, the King of the May, and the Summer King.

Ronda Arab has argued that Kempe additionally attempts to portray himself as masculine and a "skilled working man whose dancing is his labor", highlighting his refusal to drink alcohol when it is offered to him as an example of this. This runs in opposition to accusations against workers of the theater in early modern England which held that these workers were idle and effeminate. Kempe is also depicted as a free agent on the open market, as Max Thomas has argued.

Kempe meets many women in the pamphlet's narrative, which portrays them as being particularly kind toward him. However, Peter Parolin also asserts that the women who choose to dance with Kemp assert their own agency as part of his journey, and that Kempe tolerates this in the narrative for the benefit of both himself and the women.

== Printing ==
The pamphlet was recorded at the Stationers' Register on 22 April 1600. It was printed the same year in London by Edward Allde for the bookseller Nicholas Ling. Its title page features Kempe's name at the top – though this was likely Allde's prerogative – and its central image showing Kempe alongside his musician (thought to be Thomas Slye), who is playing pipe and tabor. Kempe is depicted in full morris dance wear, with particularly tensed and well-developed quadriceps to outline his dancing ability. This is the only confirmed contemporary image of Kempe to exist.

== Contemporary responses ==
Nine Daies Wonder has some lasting resonance in 17th century society. For almost a decade after Kempe's death, he received negative criticism for the journey by other actors. In William Rowley's pamphlet A Search for Money (1609), expressed irony when referring to someone who travelled by dancing "wild morrise to Norrige", and Ben Jonson, in his poem On the Famous Voyage (1616), is hostile when referring to "those […] which / Did dance the famous morris, unto Norwich".

== See also ==
- The Progress of 1578, another Tudor-era journey from London to Norwich.
