= Jig =

Folk dance and tune

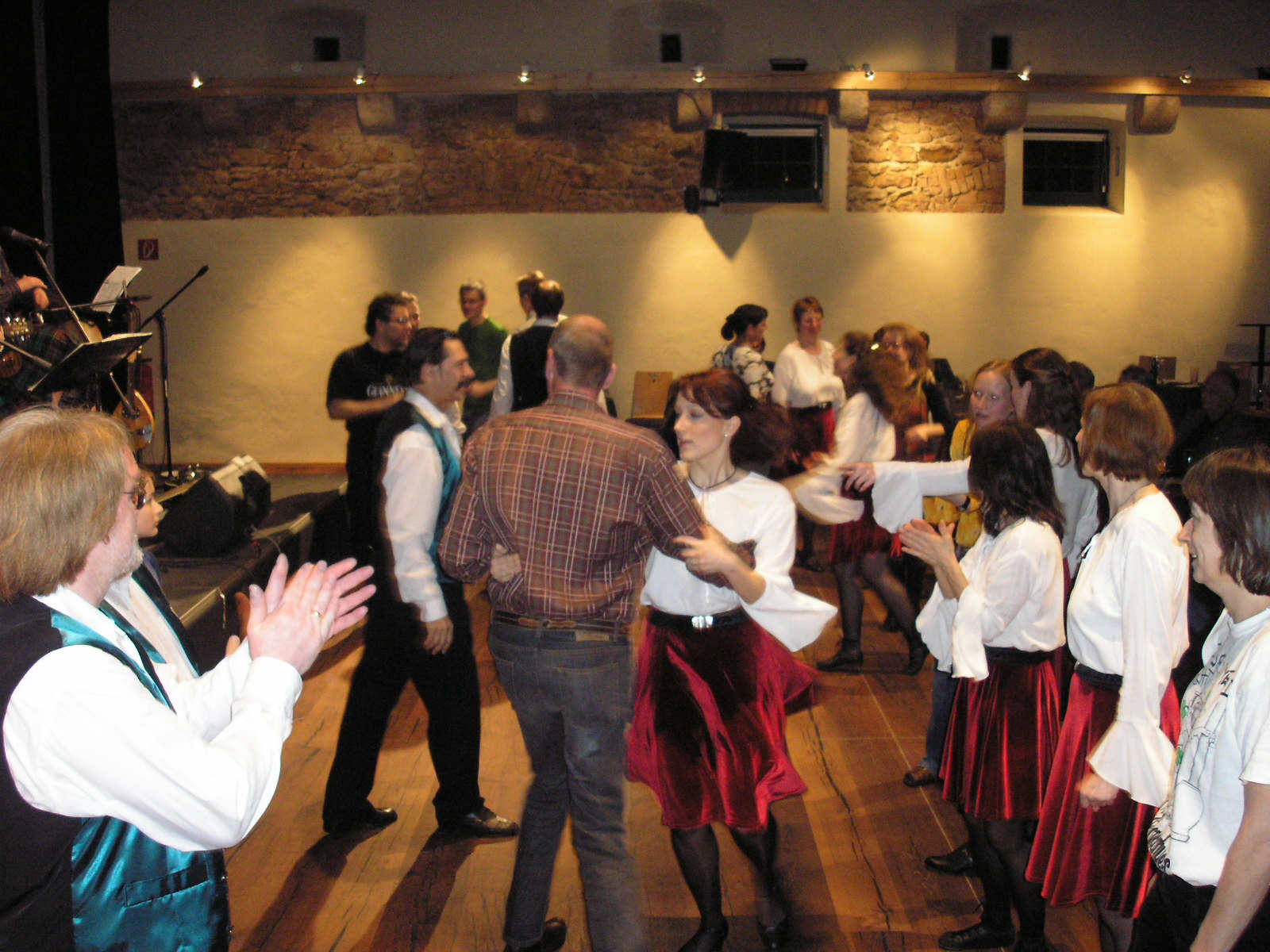
Dancing the Haymakers' Jig at an Irish ceilidh

The jig (Irish: port, Scottish Gaelic: port-cruinn) is a form of lively folk dance in compound metre, as well as the accompanying dance tune. It first gained popularity across the British Isles in the 16th-century, and was adopted on mainland Europe where it eventually became the final movement of the mature Baroque dance suite (the French gigue; Italian and Spanish giga). It is most associated with Irish dance music, Scottish country dance, French Canadian traditional music and dance, and the Métis people in Canada. Jigs were originally in quadruple compound metre, (e.g., 12/8 time), but have been adapted to a variety of time signatures, by which they are often classified into groups, including double jigs (6/8), slip jigs (9/8) and single jigs (12/8).

== Origins ==
The term jig was probably derived from the French giguer, meaning 'to jump' or the Italian giga. The use of 'jig' in Irish dance derives from the Irish jigeánnai, itself borrowed from the Old English giga meaning 'old dance'. It was known as a dance in 16th-century England, often in 12/8 time, and the term was used for a post-play entertainment featuring dance in early modern England, but which 'probably employed a great variety of dances, solo (suitable for jigs), paired, round, country or courtly'; in Playford's Dancing Master (1651) 'the dance game in "Kemps Jegg" is a typical scenario from a dramatic jig and it is likely that the combination of dance metre for steps and non-metrical passages for pantomime indicates how a solo or ensemble jig might have been danced by stage players.' Later the dance began to be associated with music particularly in 6/8 time, and with slip jigs 9/8 time.

== Ireland and Scotland ==
During the middle of the 16th century the dance was adopted in Ireland and in the 17th century Scotland, where it was widely adapted. The jig is typically associated with these countries, especially Ireland. It is second in popularity only to the reel in traditional Irish dance, and in Scottish country dance jigs and reels are the two quicktime dance forms. A jig is transcribed in compound metre, being 6/8 time. The most common structure of a jig is two eight-bar parts, performing two different steps, each once on the right foot, and one on the left foot. As with most other types of dance tunes in Irish music, at a session or a dance it is common for two or more jigs to be strung together in a set, flowing on without interruption.

== In Irish step dance ==
The following distinction is primarily observed in modern competitive Irish dance and should not be confused with the general notion of how the jigs are played and classified among traditional Irish musicians.

=== Light jigs ===
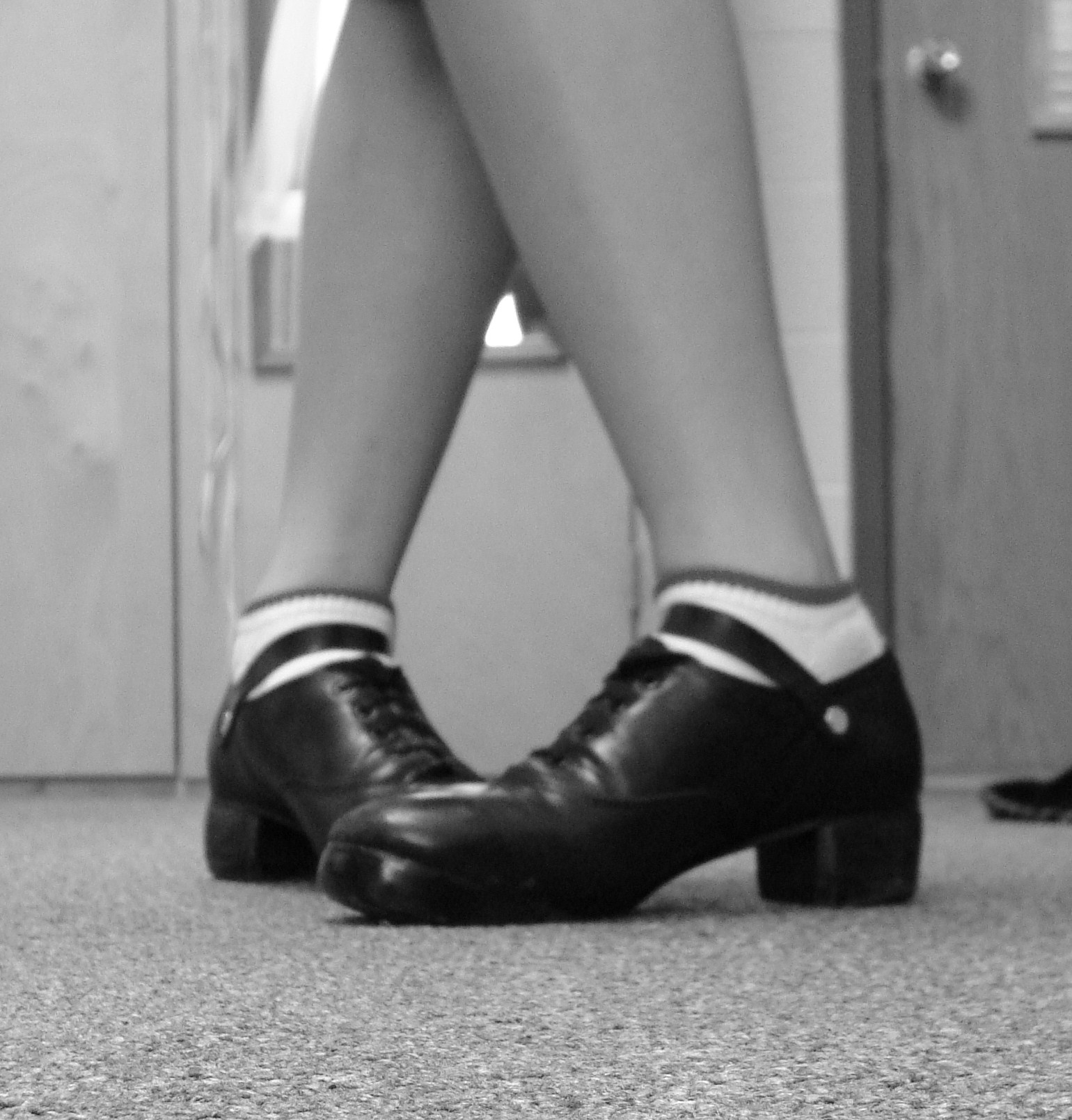
Feet shod in Irish dance hard shoes

A light jig is the second-fastest of all jigs. The performer's feet rarely leave the ground for long, as the step is fast, typically performed at a speed of around 116 bpm at feiseanna. There are several light jig steps, varying with each dance school, but the rising step, or the rise and grind, is standard in almost all light jigs. The right side version of the rising step is performed by putting weight on the left foot, lifting the right foot off the ground then hopping on the left foot once. Hop on the left foot again, bringing the right foot back behind the left foot and then shift the weight onto the right foot, leaving the left foot in the air. Dancers use the phrase "hop, hop back" for these three movements, and there is a slight pause between the hop, and hop back. The next movement is a hop on the right foot. Then shift the weight, left-right-left-right. The phrase for this whole movement is: "hop, hop back, hop back 2-3." To do the step on the left foot, reverse the left and right directions.

=== Slip jigs ===
Slip jigs are in 9/8 time. Because of the longer measures, they are longer than the reel and the light jig, with the same number of bars to the music. The dance is performed high on the toes, and is often considered the "ballet of Irish dance" because of its graceful movements that seem to slip the performers across the floor. Slip jigs are performed at a speed of 113 bpm at feiseanna.

=== Single and double jigs ===
Swallowtail jig, a double jig

Single jigs should not be confused with slides; they are the least common of the jigs, performed in ghillies, in a 6/8 or less commonly a 12/8 time. Musically, the single jig tends to follow the pattern of a quarter note followed by an eighth note (twice per 6/8 bar), whereas the pattern for the double jig is three eighth notes twice per 6/8 bar.

=== Hop jigs ===
Hop jigs are the fastest of all jigs next to light jigs, but the term hop jig causes some confusion, as some people use it for a single jig, while others use this term to refer to a tune in 9/8 time.

Among the latter, some do not distinguish it from a slip jig, while some reserve the term to a slip jig variant that has special characteristics, in particular an emphasis on quarter note–eighth note pairs.

=== Treble jigs ===
Treble jigs (also called the hard or heavy jig) are performed in hard shoes, and also to a 6/8 time metre. They are characterized by stomps, trebles, and clicks. Many set dances are performed in treble jig time, a few being Drunken Gauger, Blackthorn Stick, The Three Sea Captains, and St Patrick's Day. Two types of treble jigs are performed at feiseanna: the traditional and non-traditional (slow) treble jigs. Beginners will do a treble jig at traditional speed (92 bpm), while more advanced dancers will dance the non-traditional (slow) treble jig at 72 bpm.

The Old Grey Goose
A jig featuring the tin whistle

== Straight and sand jigs ==
In 19th-century America, the jig was the name adopted for a form of step dancing developed by enslaved African-Americans and later adopted by minstrel show performers. Danced to five-string banjo or fiddle tunes in 2/2 or 2/4 metre played at schottische tempo, the minstrel jig (also called the "straight jig" to distinguish it from Irish dances) was characterized by syncopated rhythm and eccentric movements. Jig dancers employed a repertoire of "hits" on the heel or toe, "hops" on one foot, "springs" off both feet as well as various slides and shuffles. The most famous early jig dancer was Master Juba, an African-American who inspired a host of white imitators, many of whom performed in blackface. John Diamond, an Irish-American who competed with Master Juba in a series of "challenge dances", was among the most prominent of these white minstrel jig dancers. Minstrel jigs, as well as clogs and breakdowns, were crucial to the evolution of 20th-century tap and soft-shoe dancing.

A variant of the straight jig was the "sand jig" or "sand dance", performed as a series of shuffles and slides on a sand-strewn stage. The most prominent sand jiggers of the 19th century were two women, both born in New York in 1855: Buffalo native Kitty O'Neil and her Manhattan-born rival Kitty Sharpe. Sand dancing was a staple of minstrelsy, variety and vaudeville, and was kept alive in later decades largely by African-American tap dancers, including John Bubbles, Bill "Bojangles" Robinson, Sammy Davis Jr., Harriet Browne and, most prominently, Howard "Sandman" Sims.

== See also ==
- Shakespearean dance
- The Irish Washerwoman
- Swing
- Muiñeira
