= Percy Danforth =

American bones player and engineer

- Danforth in 1977

Background information
- Also known as: Mr. Bones
- Born: March 11, 1900; Grand Forks, North Dakota, U.S.
- Died: June 10, 1992 (aged 92) Ann Arbor, Michigan, U.S.
- Education: University of Michigan (BS, MA)
- Genre: American folk music
- Occupations: Engineer, architect
- Instrument: Bones

Percy Owen "Mr. Bones" Danforth (March 11, 1900 – June 10, 1992) was an American bones player and engineer. Danforth was born in North Dakota and grew up in Washington, D.C., where he learned to play the bones as a child. He began publicly performing the bones in the 1970s in Ann Arbor, Michigan after a career in engineering and architecture, and performed the bones into his late 80s.

== Early life and education ==
Danforth was born in 1900 in North Dakota. His family moved around the United States multiple times, including a short period in San Juan, Puerto Rico in the early 1910s. Much of Danforth's childhood was spent in Washington, D.C., where he attended the William McKinley Manual Training School in Eckington.

Danforth first learned to play the bones in on the playground of his elementary school in Washington, D.C. in 1908. In a 1985 interview, Danforth recalled that after his initial introduction to the bones, his father fashioned him a set of bones from scrap wood. Danforth continued playing the bones on streets in Northwest D.C. with a group of neighbors who also practiced sand dancing. In the early 20th century, the minstrel shows that had popularized the bones in the 19th century were falling out of fashion, a change from an era when bones were available in popular mail-order catalogs.

1926 sketch by Danforth published in architectural magazine Pencil Points

Danforth enrolled at the University of Michigan in 1918 to study chemical engineering. He also continued to practice art, which led him to expand his studies to include architecture and art. Danforth graduated in 1928 with a bachelor's degree in architecture. Danforth met fellow University of Michigan student Frances Louise Adams in 1926, and they were married in 1927.

== Career in architecture and engineering ==
The Christian-Missionary Alliance Church in Monroe, Michigan, designed by Danforth in the early 1930s

Danforth opened an architectural firm in Monroe, Michigan after his graduation from the University of Michigan. Business at the firm was slow due to the Great Depression, and Frances began teaching piano lessons to increase their income. One known example of his firm's work is the Christian Missionary Alliance Church building in Monroe, which was built from over 70,000 reclaimed bricks from a street repaving project. The cornerstone for the building was laid in 1934, with most of the construction labor done by the congregation. The congregation began meeting in the partially-completed building in 1935, and the church was complete in 1937.

The Great Depression meant that the architecture firm was not viable, and Danforth began working as an art teacher in the Monroe Public Schools district. In addition to his teaching in the late 1930s, Danforth received a master's degree in art education from the University of Michigan. He was preparing for an art education PhD program at Michigan when World War II broke out, and he began working at the Willow Run manufacturing plant as a quality control engineer. After the war, Danforth continued his engineering career in the metrology field. He worked for the Industrial Metrology Division of Bendix Corporation, and later worked for Ann Arbor-based measurement equipment manufacturer Balance Technology.

== Return to playing bones ==
In early 1972, Frances Danforth was studying ethnomusicology at Eastern Michigan University, and mentioned Percy's bones playing to music professor Edith Borroff. Borroff invited Percy to play the bones for her class, and he made his concert debut shortly afterwards at Pease Auditorium in March 1972.

Danforth recalled that his first performance was well-received, even though his technique was then quite unrefined: "I was flabbergasted when this thing just about brought the house down. Nobody had ever seen anything like that before. I had learned to do it with two hands in a very elementary kind of way." Following the Pease Auditorium performance, Danforth began performing in the Southeast Michigan area, and by 1975 he had acquired the nickname "Mr. Bones."

Danforth performed at major festivals, including the Mariposa Folk Festival, the Fox Hollow Festival and the Philadelphia Folk Festival, which according to fellow bones player Sandor Slomovits "bent its policy of not having any performer more than three years in a row and invited him ten years running." In 1983, he performed alongside Joan Morris and William Bolcom at Alice Tully Hall in New York City, where The New York Times described him as "an 82-year-old architect, who is recognized the world over as a virtuoso player of a uniquely American percussion instrument."

Danforth regularly performed in Ann Arbor with the University of Michigan Percussion Ensemble, including an annual Halloween-themed concert where he played a set of glow-in-the-dark bones. He also remained dedicated to the bones despite health challenges. In one instance, after a heart attack in 1982, he had a set of bones smuggled into St. Joseph Mercy Hospital so that he could play the bones while being monitored by an electrocardiograph.

After finding himself unhappy with the quality of the plastic bones that he was playing, Danforth began to design and distribute bones made to his specifications. As their name suggests, the bones were originally animal bones, although modern instruments are made of a variety of materials. Danforth's bones were made by retired farmer and woodworker Ray Schairer, who produced over 20,000 sets by 1993. Danforth's bones were made from multiple materials, including pine, walnut, rosewood, and ebony.

== Personal life ==
Danforth met Frances Louise Adams at a Halloween party in 1926. They were married in April 1927, and had two children.

Danforth died on June 10, 1992 in Ann Arbor.
