= Harriet Browne (dancer) =

American tap dancer

- Born: August 7, 1932; Chicago, Illinois
- Died: September 1, 1997 (aged 65); Bronx, New York
- Occupation(s): Dancer, choreographer, teacher
- Children: 2

Harriet "Quicksand" Browne (August 7, 1932 – September 1, 1997) was an American tap dancer, educator and choreographer who was best known for her innovation in sanding. Browne got a job dancing in the chorus but shortly afterwards got pregnant and had a son, which put a temporary stop to her dancing career. After the birth of her son, she resumed dancing as a soloist and as a member of the chorus in clubs around Chicago. During the 1950s, she toured with Cab Calloway's band. After she got a job in the chorus at a club in Greenwich Village, although she continued to tour, she settled in New York City.

She began teaching at the Bronx Dance Theatre during the 1970s. She opened her own studio during the 1980s and founded the Aristaccato Tap Company. Browne specialized in sanding. She appeared on stage with performers such as Flip Wilson, Betty Carter, Dinah Washington, Della Reese, T-Bone Walker, Sister Sledge and The Pointer Sisters. She performed with tap dancers including Bunny Briggs, Charles Cook, James "Buster" Brown and The Silver Belles.

She married Edward Browne during the 1970s. Browne died at the age of 65 in Montefiore Hospital in the Bronx. In 2016, she was named to the International Tap Dance Hall of Fame.

== Early life ==
Browne was born on the south side of Chicago, Illinois to her parents Ruby and Reuben Jordan. Her entire immediate family was musically inclined as her mother was a hotel worker and amateur musician; her father was a pharmacist, shoe salesman, and self-taught dancer; and her elder sister, Marquita, was a singer.

Browne's interest in dance stemmed from watching tap performances at Chicago's Regal Theater and from learning from her father who was a specialist in Snake Hips dancing. As a preteen, she started taking jazz and rhythm lessons from the Bruce Sisters.

By the age of fifteen, she was performing in many of Chicago's nightclubs alongside her sister. This act, where her sister sang and Browne tap danced, was known as the Jordan Sisters. Browne also booked jobs alone in nightclubs such as Club DeLisa, NRA Theatre, and Robert's Show Club. Her ultimate goal was to become a chorus line dancer—a feat difficult for an African American to achieve.

The daughter of Reuben Jordan, pharmacist and shoe salesman, and Ruby Jordan, hotel worker, she was born Harriet Jordan in Chicago. She was exposed to music and dance by her family from a young age and liked to listen to jazz. She dropped out of high school when she was fifteen to find employment as a dancer.

== Career ==
In the early 1950s, Browne left Chicago to pursue chorus line dancing in New York City. As many nightclubs only hired white dancers, it was difficult for Browne to find consistent work. However, she did perform in the chorus lines at Club Savannah in Greenwich Village.

Her tap choreography also earned her a place in various variety shows and nightclubs. Over the course of her career, she tapped alongside the Cab Calloway Band, Flip Wilson, Betty Carter, Dinah Washington, Della Reese, and T-bone Walker. She also had the opportunity to perform at Carnegie Hall with Gregory Hines and Bunny Briggs.

Browne took a 15-year break from dancing around the 1960s to mid-1970s. It wasn't until Barbara Klien, the artistic director of the Bronx Dance Theater, heard about Browne from a student that she encouraged Browne to take up dancing again.

While working towards a certification from Dance Educators of America, Browne worked as a tap teacher at the Bronx Dance Theater. She devised the syllabus for the Theater's tap program. With this experience, she went on to form her own dance studio, the Aristaccato Tap Company in the early 1990s. The company focused on teaching jazz and tap dance to underprivileged youths in the Bronx.

Browne also became the youngest member of The Silver Belles, an African American dance troupe based in Harlem, New York and made up of former chorus line dancers.

One of Browne's most well-known pupils is Michelle Dorrance.

== Sanding ==
Browne was well known for her incredibly fast, improvisational tap dancing on sand. By sprinkling a thin layer of sand over a wooden board, the rhythms of her tap shoes could be both "enhanced and softened." Although she didn't invent the style, she became known as one of the best. Gregory Hines once called her “the world's greatest female sand dancer”.

This is where her nickname, “Quicksand”, originated.

== Death ==
Browne died on September 1, 1997, at Montefiore Hospital in the Bronx. Although her exact cause of death was not revealed, it is known that she suffered from muscle spasms and psoriasis for many years before her death.

== Recognitions ==
- 1995-1996: Received Choreographer's Fellowship from National Endowment for the Arts
- 1996: Honored for her choreography at Lincoln Center for the Performing Arts’ Alice Tully Hall on National Tap Dance Day
- 1997: Recognized as one of the “Great Dancing Ladies of Harlem” by the International Women in Jazz organization
- 2016: Inducted into American Tap Dance Foundation’s International Tap Dance Hall of Fame
