= Kitty O'Neil (dancer) =

American dancer (1855–1893)

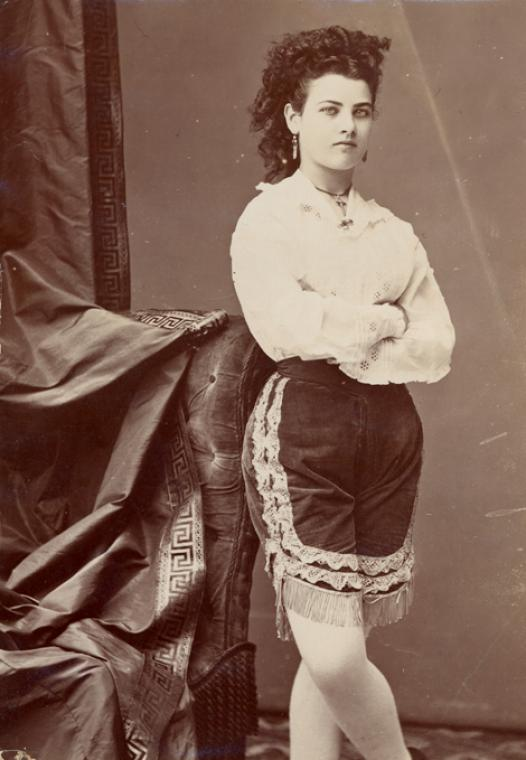
- NYPL Digital Collection
- Born: 1855; Buffalo, New York, United States
- Died: April 16, 1893; Buffalo, New York, United States
- Occupation: Variety dancer
- Writing career
- Years active: c. 1863–1892

Kitty O'Neil (1855 – April 16, 1893) was one of the most celebrated American variety theatre dancers of the late 19th century. From around 1863 until 1892, she performed in New York City, Boston and elsewhere in the United States, and at her death was acclaimed by The New York Times as "the best female jig dancer in the world." O'Neil's name is remembered today chiefly because of "Kitty O'Neil's Champion", a "sand jig" named in her honor that was first published in 1882 and revived starting in the 1970s by fiddler Tommy Peoples and other Irish traditional musicians.

== Dancing career ==
Catherine O'Neil, famous on stage as "Kitty" O'Neil, was born in 1855 in Buffalo, New York to William O'Neil, a New York-born machinist and saloonkeeper, and his wife Elizabeth (née McKernan), an immigrant from Ireland. She first performed in public at about the age of eight, proving to be so talented and precocious that her parents took her to a Prof. Newville of Rochester, New York to learn "fancy dancing". In her earliest years on the stage, she danced at theaters in Buffalo, Chicago, Pittsburgh and Syracuse. Variety impresario Tony Pastor heard of her talent and summoned her to New York City, where she made her debut at Pastor's Bowery "Opera House" on January 23, 1871.

O'Neil was, to the confusion of later chroniclers, the second "Kitty O'Neil" who performed in this era for Tony Pastor. The first, also known as "Kathleen O'Neil", was a Dublin-born singer who arrived in the U.S. in 1861 and began performing with Pastor the following year. The dancing Kitty O'Neil's reputation soon eclipsed that of her singing predecessor. She was regularly featured in Pastor's company in New York and on tour for months after her debut, and also danced in this period for producer John Stetson at the Howard Athenaeum, the leading variety hall in Boston. From the fall of 1872 through 1878, O'Neil's theatrical home base was New York's Theatre Comique, managed by Josh Hart and, from 1876 on, by Edward Harrigan. A typical billing for Kitty from a Comique playbill in the Harrigan era read: "Acknowledged by the Press and Public to be the only Female Jig Dancer extant, all others are mere imitators and their futile efforts when compared with Miss O'Neil's artistic abilities fall below mediocrity."

O'Neil's specialties were the "rale old Irish reel", the Lancashire clog (danced in wooden shoes) and the "straight jig", a peculiarly American form developed by minstrel show performers who danced to syncopated tunes in 2/4 or 2/2 time rather than the typical 6/8, 9/8 or 12/8 meters of Irish jigs. She was most renowned, however, for her "sand jig", a straight jig performed as a series of shuffles and slides on a sand-strewn stage to music in schottische tempo.

O'Neil's dance costume in her early years on stage, as seen in the carte de visite photo above, was virtually identical to that of her male contemporaries. As dance historian April F. Masten noted: “…rather than donning the flesh-colored tights of female chorus dancers, which suggested nudity, she sports the white stockings, black pumps, and long-sleeved blouse of her male cohort, which signified skill.”

As Harrigan moved away from variety to produce his own full-length plays, O'Neil worked more often for Tony Pastor and other variety producers in New York and Boston, as well as on tours of smaller cities. In the later years of her career, she was most frequently booked at Hyde and Behman's Theater in Downtown Brooklyn, and at the Bowery and Eighth Avenue theaters operated in Manhattan by Henry C. Miner. Her last New York City performance was at the London Theatre, another Bowery variety house, in 1888. O'Neil then returned to her native Buffalo and, following an 1890 trip to California with Hyde's Specialty Company, retired from touring. Her final public performance was in the summer of 1891 at Shea's Music Hall in Buffalo.

== Personal life ==
In 1873, Kitty O'Neil married Ed Power who, with song-and-dance man Frank Kerns, kept a saloon catering to the theatrical profession at the corner of Crosby and Prince Streets in lower Manhattan. Power died of tuberculosis in 1878, after which Kitty married Harry Kernell, a Philadelphia-born comedian who, together with his brother John, was another celebrated Pastor trouper. Kitty had two children by Kernell, neither of whom survived infancy. She and Kernell divorced in 1887. After O'Neil retired to Buffalo, she became the manager of the Alhambra Theater and in 1892 married saloonkeeper Alfred Pettie. She died in 1893 of peritonitis and nephritis following an unsuccessful abdominal operation for an unspecified "female complaint" and kidney problems. She was buried in Buffalo's Holy Cross cemetery.

== Kitty's "Champion Jig" ==
Kitty's reputation as the premier sand jigger of her day inspired the composition of "Kitty O'Neil's Champion", an elaborate seven-part sand jig that first appeared in Ryan's Mammoth Collection, a popular tune book published in Boston in 1882. Kitty's "Champion Jig" incorporated an earlier two-part straight jig called "Kitty O'Neil", which, as it was first published around 1869 before Kitty the dancer came to prominence, may have been named for the earlier Kitty O'Neil, the singer.

Most of the tunes in Ryan's were later reprinted in 1000 Fiddle Tunes, first published in Chicago in 1940 by M.M. Cole and kept in print for decades thereafter. 1000 Fiddle Tunes served as the source of new repertoire for many American, Canadian and Irish traditional musicians. In the 1970s, Donegal-born fiddler Tommy Peoples came across "Kitty O'Neil's Champion" in 1000 Fiddle Tunes and began playing it in stage performances, recording it in 1982 on his LP The Iron Man. Peoples, however, mistakenly called the tune "Kitty O'Shea", with the result that other musicians who learned the tune from his playing also subsequently recorded it under that name. Versions have been recorded by, among others, fiddler Kevin Burke, uilleann piper Paddy Keenan, the concertina/fiddle duo Edel Fox and Neill Byrne, tenor banjo player Eamonn Coyne (with fiddler Megan Henderson), harmonica player Pip Murphy (with the Tin Sandwich Band), the fiddle/button accordion duo Marie and Martin Reilly, the concertina and fiddle duo of Loretto Reid and Brian Taheny, and the fiddlers Athena Tergis and Ciarán Ó Maonaigh

No composer was credited for the tune in Ryan's but it may have been a contribution of the editor, William Bradbury Ryan. A very similar tune in the collection, "Kitty Sharpe's Champion", honored Kitty O'Neil's greatest contemporary and rival, a New-York-born straight and sand jig dancer who performed in many of the same variety theaters as Kitty O'Neil, as well as in the circus.
