= A Waste of Shame =

2005 television film

- Rupert Graves as Shakespeare
- Genre: Period drama; Biopic
- Written by: William Boyd
- Directed by: John McKay
- Starring: Rupert Graves; Tom Sturridge; Nicholas Rowe; Indira Varma
- Composer: Kevin Sargent
- Country of origin: United Kingdom
- Original language: English

Production
- Executive producers: Richard Fell; Sally Woodward Gentle
- Producer: Chrissy Skinns
- Production location: Richard May
- Cinematography: Tim Palmer
- Editor: Anne Sopel
- Running time: 90 minutes

Original release
- Network: BBC Four
- Release: 22 November 2005

A Waste of Shame (aka A Waste of Shame: The Mystery of Shakespeare and His Sonnets) is a 90-minute television drama on the circumstances surrounding William Shakespeare's composition of his sonnets. It takes its title from the first line of Sonnet 129. It was first broadcast on BBC Four on 22 November 2005 as part of the supporting programming for the BBC's ShakespeaRe-Told season, but was only loosely connected to the rest of the series.

Its screenplay was written by William Boyd, and the film was directed by John McKay. Lines from the sonnets are presented as thoughts running through Shakespeare's mind.

== Plot ==
1609: Shakespeare is struggling to complete his sonnets while the plague rages. He sees the body of a young child and remembers the moment in 1596 when he learned of the illness of his son Hamnet while rehearsing a play in London. Returning to Stratford-upon-Avon, he was subjected to abuse from his shrewish wife Anne for neglecting his family by living in the capital. His son died, and an embarrassing argument between his father John and Anne disrupted the funeral. John later told him that the family was in financial difficulties. William agreed to pay off the debt, but to do so he had to return to London.

1597: Shakespeare receives a bag of money from Mary Sidney, Countess of Pembroke, for writing the procreation sonnets, to encourage her son, the young William Herbert to marry. He meets the young aristocrat and becomes strangely attracted to him. Herbert says that he will meet Shakespeare again when he comes to London.

Disturbed by his attraction to the youth, Shakespeare gets drunk in a brothel run by his friend George Wilkins. Wilkins tempts him with a new dusky-skinned "half breed" called Lucie, just come from France. Shakespeare has sex with her, and begins to see her regularly.

At a performance of Hamlet, Herbert and his young friends meet up with Shakespeare. They are keen to experience the seedier side of London life, so Shakespeare takes them to Wilkins' brothel. There they enjoy the pleasures on offer but Herbert is shocked to see Wilkins help some men to beat up one of the women. Shakespeare tells him to ignore it and that the woman is being punished for allegedly giving a client syphilis.

Shakespeare becomes increasingly close to Herbert and is entranced by him, but discovers that his rival Ben Jonson is now one of Herbert's cronies. He also becomes more deeply involved with Lucie. Lucie tells him that she is leaving Wilkins. She now has her own lodgings paid for by another client, but tells Shakespeare that he, not her patron, is her true favourite. Later, Shakespeare visits Herbert's house, but is brushed off by a servant who claims that Herbert has gone to the country. He realises that Herbert is avoiding him. Shakespeare follows Herbert and discovers that Lucie has become Herbert's mistress, and that he pays for her lodgings. Embittered, he writes Measure for Measure.

He meets Herbert again at a performance of the play. He learns that Lucie has gone back to France. The two part awkwardly.

A new outbreak of plague leads to the closure of the London theatres. Shakespeare, Richard Burbage and William Kempe discuss the options for their acting troupe. However, Shakespeare starts to notice worrying signs of illness on his body. He returns to Stratford to get a diagnosis from John Hall and is told that he does not have the plague, but he does have syphilis. He writes up his sonnets for publication, and then leaves London to live in Stratford-upon-Avon.

== Cast ==
- Rupert Graves – William Shakespeare
- Tom Sturridge – William Herbert ("the Fair Youth")
- Indira Varma – Lucie ("the Dark Lady")
- Zoë Wanamaker – Countess of Pembroke
- Anna Chancellor – Anne Hathaway
- Andrew Tiernan – Ben Jonson
- Nicky Henson – John Shakespeare
- Alan Williams – George Wilkins
- Nicholas Rowe – Richard Burbage
- John Voce – William Kempe
- Tom Hiddleston – John Hall
- Christopher Fairbank – Physician
- Ian Hughes – Thomas Thorpe
- Camilla Arfwedson - Lucie's maid
- Clem Tibber – Hamnet Shakespeare
- Tom Mison – Young Blood
- Evie Butcher – Judith Shakespeare
- Alice Butcher – Susanna Shakespeare

== Production ==
The BBC asked Boyd to dramatise the Sonnet's love triangle as a free adaptation of Shakespeare's life.

== Reception and critical history ==
The film received critical attention in Paul Franssen's Shakespeare's Literary Lives: The Author as Character in Fiction and Film (2016). Franssen primarily sees the plot's love triangle between Shakespeare, William Herbert (the Fair Youth), and "Lucy Negro" (the Dark Lady) as inherently misogynistic: Shakespeare and Herbert both exploit Lucie as a proxy for their own relationship. He views Boyd's choice of a British-Indian actress (Indira Varma), her portrayal as being "half Moorish, half French", and her being costumed in a traditional Tuareg headdress (playing on the western world's post-9/11 fear of the Muslim world) as a deliberate othering, such that Shakespeare and Herbert's exploitation of her becomes a metaphor for the West's meddling in and exploitation of other cultures (a post-colonialist perspective). In "Shakespeare's Life on Film and Television: Shakespeare In Love and A Waste of Shame" (2016) Franssen also contrasted A Waste of Shame with Shakespeare in Love (1998) to examine "the question of how two such different visions of Shakespeare were produced within a decade of each other ... from the perspectives of genre, themes, historical referentiality, and polyphony."

Jane Kingsley-Smith, in "Shakespeare's sonnets and the claustrophobic reader: making space in modern Shakespeare fiction" (2013), argues that claustrophilia is a thematic and structural motif in the Sonnets, based on analysis of A Waste of Shame and Anthony Burgess' Nothing Like the Sun: A Story of Shakespeare's Love Life (1964).

== Sources ==
- "A Waste of Shame: The Mystery of Shakespeare and His Sonnets (2005)". Film Forever. British Film Institute. n.d. Archived from the original on 6 January 2018.
- Franssen, Paul (2016a). Shakespeare's Literary Lives: The Author as Character in Fiction and Film. Cambridge: Cambridge University Press. doi:10.1017/CBO9781316410851. ISBN 9781316410851. S2CID 192165865 – via Cambridge Core.
- Földváry, Kinga (2013). "'Brush up your Shakespeare': Genre-Shift from Shakespeare to the Screen". In Brown, Sarah Annes; Lublin, Robert I.; McCulloch, Lynsey (eds.). Reinventing the Renaissance: Shakespeare and his Contemporaries in Adaptation and Performance. Springer. pp. 47–62. ISBN 9781137319401.
- Franssen, Paul (2016b). "Shakespeare's Life on Film and Television: Shakespeare In Love and A Waste of Shame". In Minier, Márta; Pennacchia, Maddalena (eds.). Adaptation, Intermediality and the British Celebrity Biopic. Routledge. pp. 101–115. ISBN 9781317185550.
- Jeffries, Stuart (21 January 2006). "William Boyd". Screen player. The Guardian.
- Kingsley-Smith, Jane (2013). "Shakespeare's sonnets and the claustrophobic reader: making space in modern Shakespeare fiction". Shakespeare. 9 (2). Taylor & Francis: 187–203. doi:10.1080/17450918.2013.784796. eISSN 1745-0926. ISSN 1745-0918. S2CID 190686035.
