= Margaret Dean Smith =

- Born: Lilian Gracie Copeman; 7 November 1899; Lowestoft
- Died: 9 February 1997 (aged 97); Royal Surrey County Hospital
- Other names: Lilian Gracie Copeman; Margaret Josephine Dean-Smith; Margaret Josephine Dean
- Education: Birkbeck College
- Occupations: librarian and folklorist
- Parent: Frederica Henrietta Copeman

Margaret Dean Smith or Lilian Gracie Copeman; Margaret Josephine Dean-Smith; Margaret Josephine Dean (7 November 1899 – 9 February 1997) was an English folklorist and librarian.

== Life ==
Smith was born in Lowestoft in 1899 with the name of Lilian Gracie Copeman. Her mother, Frederica Henrietta Copeman, was a "mother's help" and the following year she was adopted by Clara Ellen (Nellie) Dean and given the new name of Margaret Josephine Dean. Her new mother married Arnold Dunbar Smith in 1911 and her third name was Margaret Josephine Dunbar Smith. Her new step father was a shy but successful Arts and Crafts architect who had designed the Mary Ward House (with Cecil Claude Brewer).

From a young age she was surrounded by people involved in the revival of the Arts and Crafts Movement. She was educated by tutors before she went to St Albans High School for Girls, which she left in 1917. Her school education was complete but she went on to live in 1921 above the headquarters of the Art-Workers' Guild. The following year she became an active member of the English Folk Dance Society meeting the folk singing revivalist Cecil Sharp.

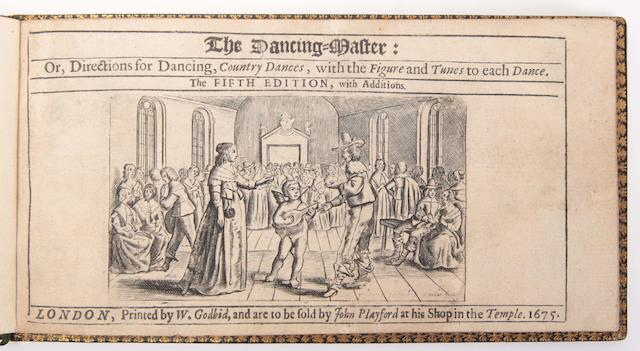
The Dancing Master by John Playford from 1675

In 1933 she took a degree in history at London's Birkbeck College. In 1939 she was working for the BBC cataloguing their large collection of gramophone records. She had decided that this was her role in life to bring order to libraries.

In 1957 she completed her book Playford's English Dancing Master. The 1651 book The Dancing Master by John Playford had been designed for teaching dancing. It was originally small so that the dancing master could hide it under his cloak and consult it surreptitiously. This work had been the first publication of English dance tunes and her publication established her as the expert on this work.

Smith died in Royal Surrey County Hospital in 1997.
