= Bones (instrument) =

Musical instrument

The bones
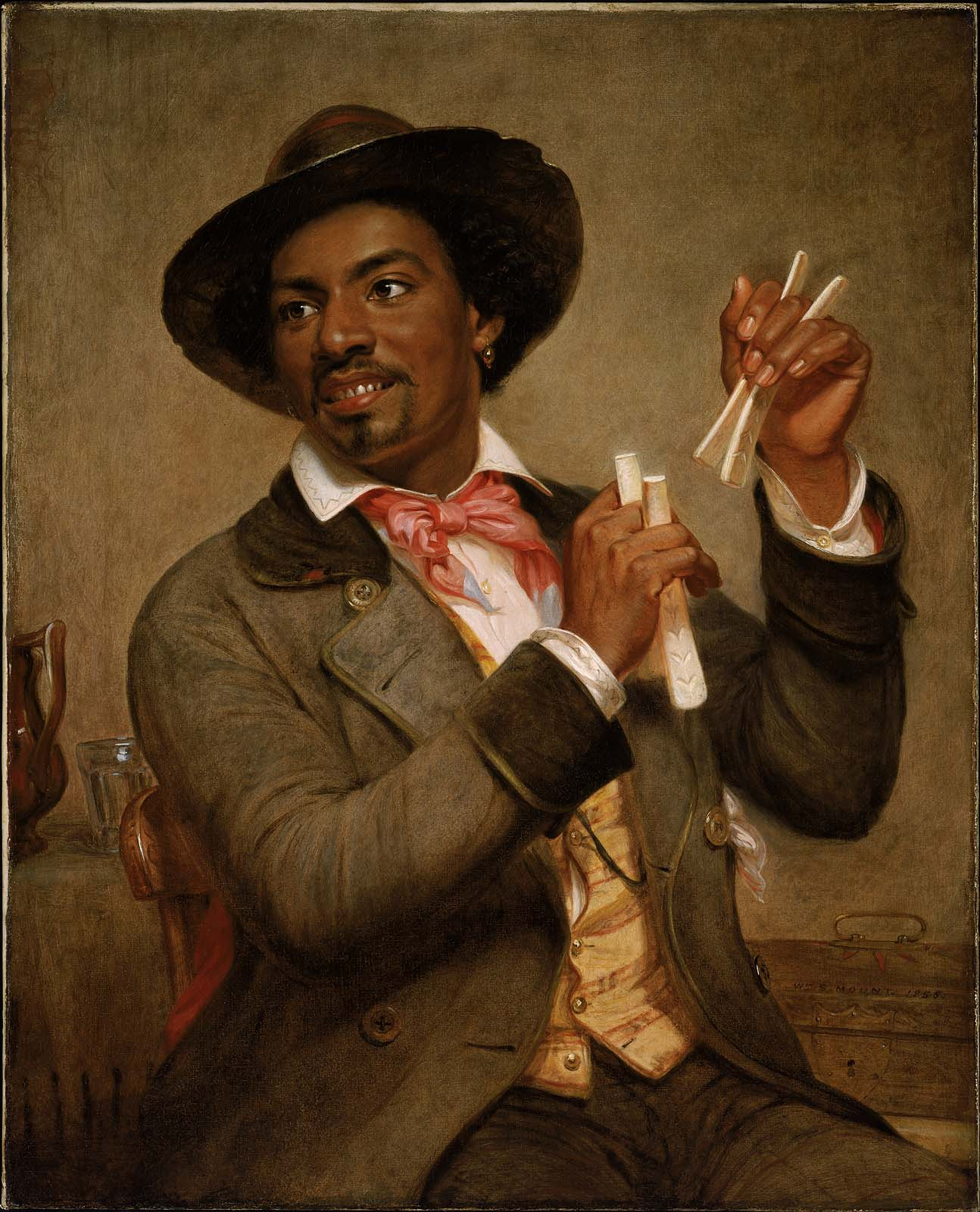
- The Bone Player by William Sidney Mount, 1856

Percussion instrument
- Other names: bones
- Classification: Idiophone; Struck idiophone; Directly struck idiophones
- Hornbostel–Sachs classification: 111.11 (Concussion sticks or stick clappers)

Related instruments
- Castanets; Spoon (musical instrument)

The bones, also known as rhythm bones, are a folk instrument that, in their original form, consists of a pair of animal bones, but may also be played on pieces of wood or similar material. Sections of large rib bones and lower leg bones are the most commonly used bones, although wooden sticks shaped like true bones are now more often used. Metal spoons may be used instead, as is common in the United States, known as "playing the spoons". The technique probably arrived in the U.S. via Irish and other European immigrants, and has a history stretching back to ancient China, Egypt, Greece, and Rome. They have contributed to many music genres, including 19th century minstrel shows, traditional Irish and Scottish music, the blues, bluegrass, zydeco, French-Canadian music, and music from Cape Breton in Nova Scotia. The clacking of the loose rib bones produces a much sharper sound than the zydeco washboard or frottoir, which mimics rattling a bone up and down a fixed ribcage.

"While he rattled a couple of bones" - from an illustration by Henry Holiday to Lewis Carroll's The Hunting of the Snark, 1876

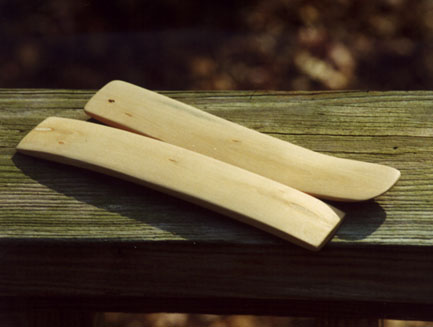
A pair of musical bones carved from maple

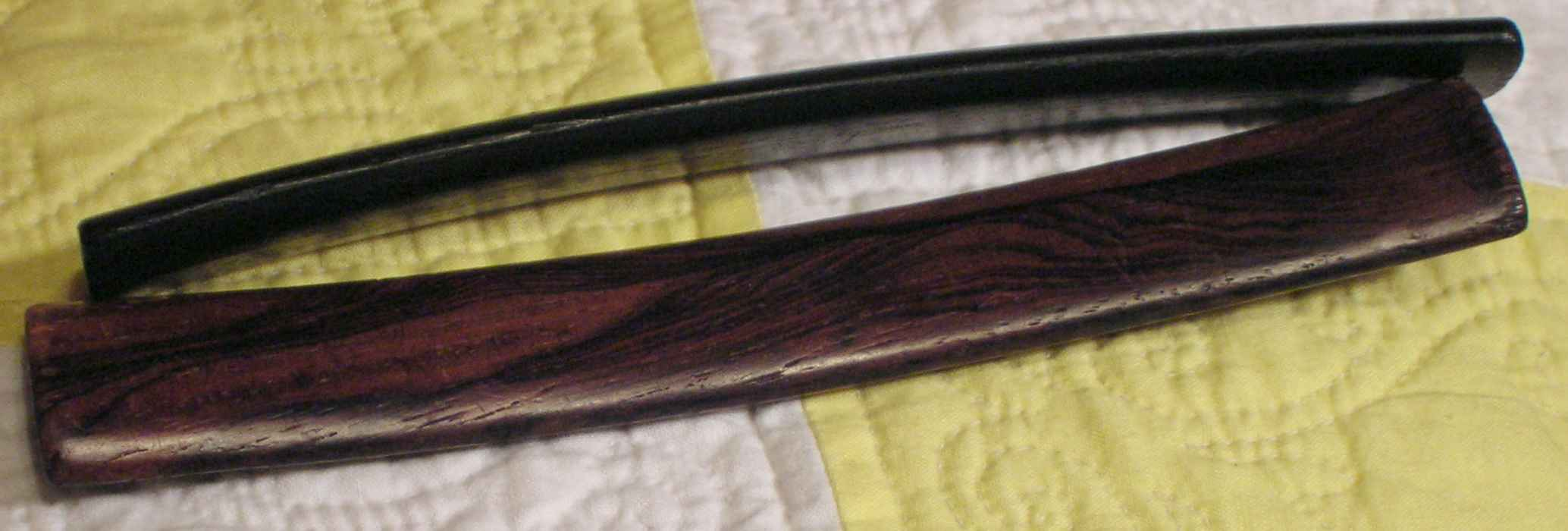
A pair of wooden musical bones

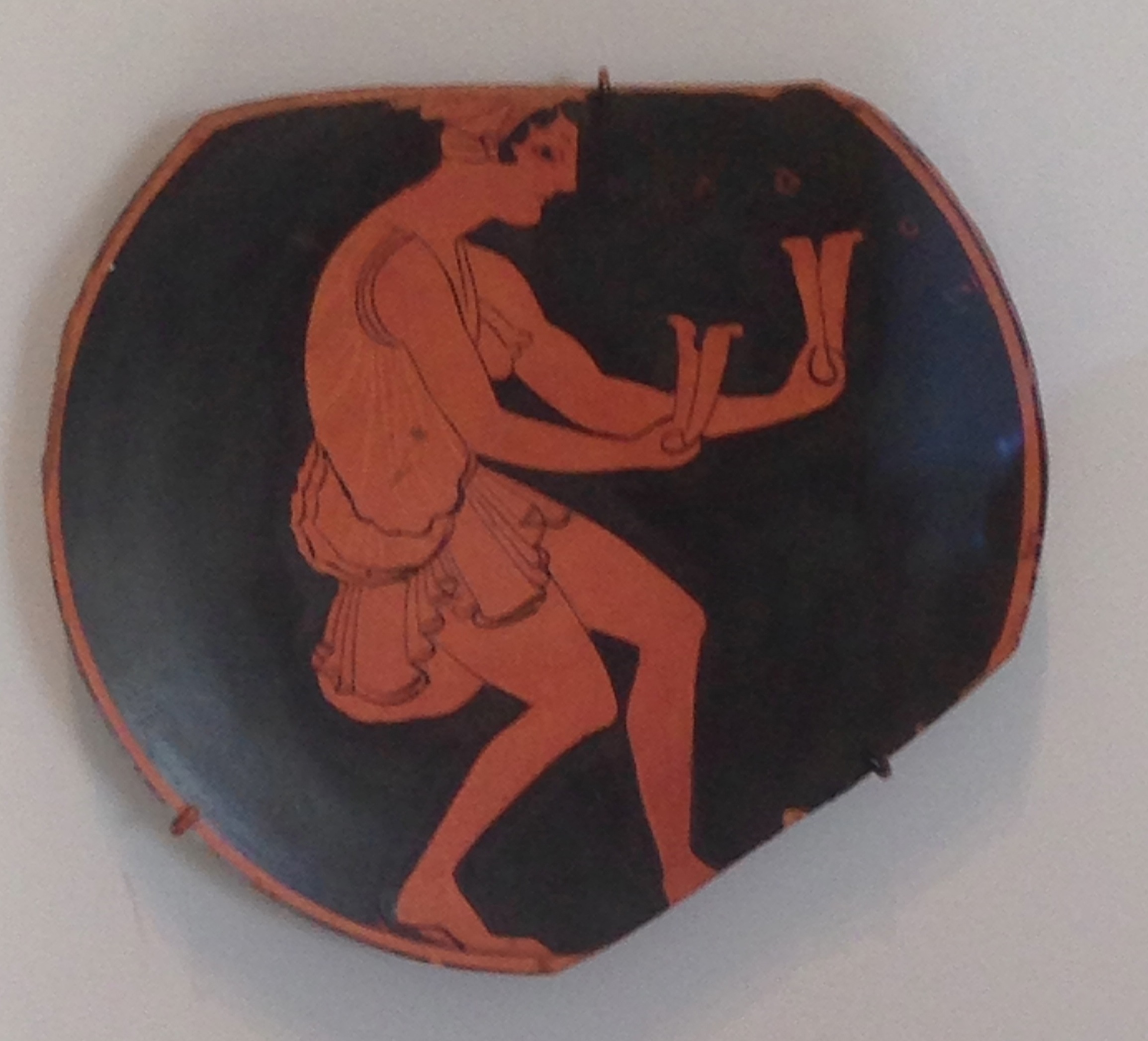
Fragment of a Kylix, Greek, 510-500 BCE, Terracotta, red-figure technique

== Description ==
Rhythm bones are typically about 12 to 18 cm (5 to 7 in) in length, but can be much longer, and they are often curved, roughly resembling miniature barrel staves. Bones can also be flat, for example by the cutting of a yardstick. They are played by holding them between one's fingers, convex surfaces facing one another, and moving one's wrist in such a way that they knock against each other. One method involves placing the bones to either side of the middle finger such that approximately two-thirds of their length extends along the palm while the remainder protrudes above the fingers on the backside of the hand. The hand is held in a loose fist with the bones and the curled fingers roughly parallel to the palm, with the bone closest to the ring finger gently held against the palm by the tip of the ring finger placed on its edge, while the other bone is left free to move in the "hinge" formed by the index and middle fingers as they gently hold it. It is also possible to play the "hinge" on the lower (ring finger) bone while locking the top (index finger) bone against the palm.

== Technique ==
A player may use a pair of bones in each hand, or just a single pair in one hand.

A critical element to playing the bones is not trying to force them to make contact with one another through finger manipulation but allowing their momentum to do the work. By moving the hand back and forth across the chest, with just enough force on the bones to keep them from falling out of the hand, a patient learner can produce a triple click. This "click-it-y" sound is the essential ingredient to playing the bones. A double-click can be produced by the same movement of the hand with the addition of a bit of pressure to the bones to suppress the third click. Once these elemental triple and double figures have been mastered, they can be combined to create complex combinations of rhythmic sounds. The effect is further enhanced by the use of two pairs of bones, one in each hand. A skilled practitioner can produce a wide variety of percussive sounds reminiscent of those made by a tap dancer.

The Irish tradition is unique to the island. While North American players are typically two-handed, the Irish tradition finds the vast majority of bones players using only one hand, a distinction in method that has a strong impact on musical articulation.

The comparison of the function of banjo rolls with that of bones within an ensemble suggests that stereotypically a subdivided accompaniment pattern is played on the bones.

The song "This Old Man" describes bone playing, particularly sheep bone playing (hence paddywhack).

== Notable bones players ==
- Hillar Bergman
- Brother Bones (1902–1974)
- Scatman Crothers (1910–1986)
- Dom Flemons both with and without the Carolina Chocolate Drops
- Peadar Mercier (1914–1991)
- Charles "Charlie Bones" Ginsburg (1921–2008)
- Barry "Bones" Patton
- Percy Danforth (1900-1992)
- Len Davies the Bonesman (1919-2000)
- John Burrill "Mister Bones" (1920-1993)
- Martin Fay (1936-2012) of The Chieftains

== See also ==
- Clapper (musical instrument)
- Paiban - Chinese wooden clappers
- Castanets
- Jawbone (instrument)
