= Jig (theatre) =

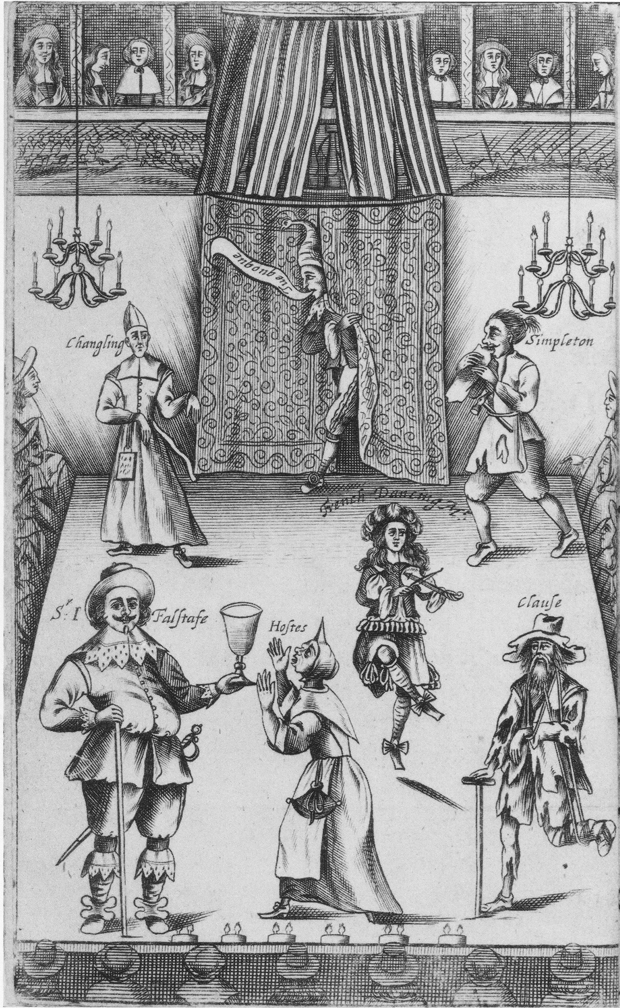
Characters from various plays of this era (1662)

In theatres, beginning in Elizabethan London, a jig was a short comic drama that immediately followed a full-length play. This phenomenon added an additional comic or light-hearted offering at the end of a performance. A jig might include songs sung to popular tunes of the day, and it might feature dance, stage fighting, cross-dressing, disguisings, asides, masks, and elements of pantomime.

These short comic dramas are referred to by historians as stage jigs, dramatic jigs, or Elizabethan jigs. The term, jig, at the same time maintained its common definition, which refers to a type of dance or music. In the various primary sources the term appears with a number of different spellings: jigg, jigge, gig, gigg, gigge, gigue, jigue, jeg, jegg, and jygge.

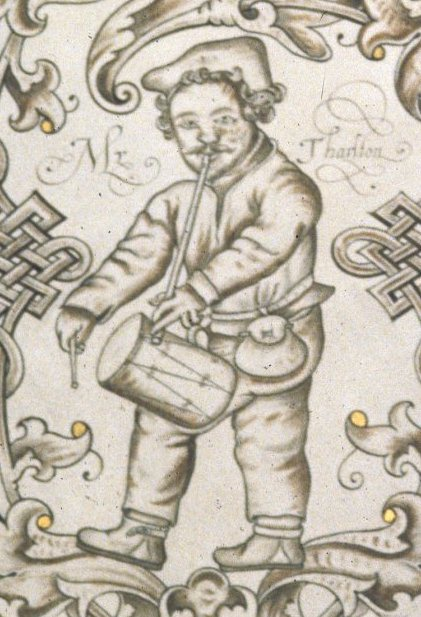
Richard Tarleton

== History ==
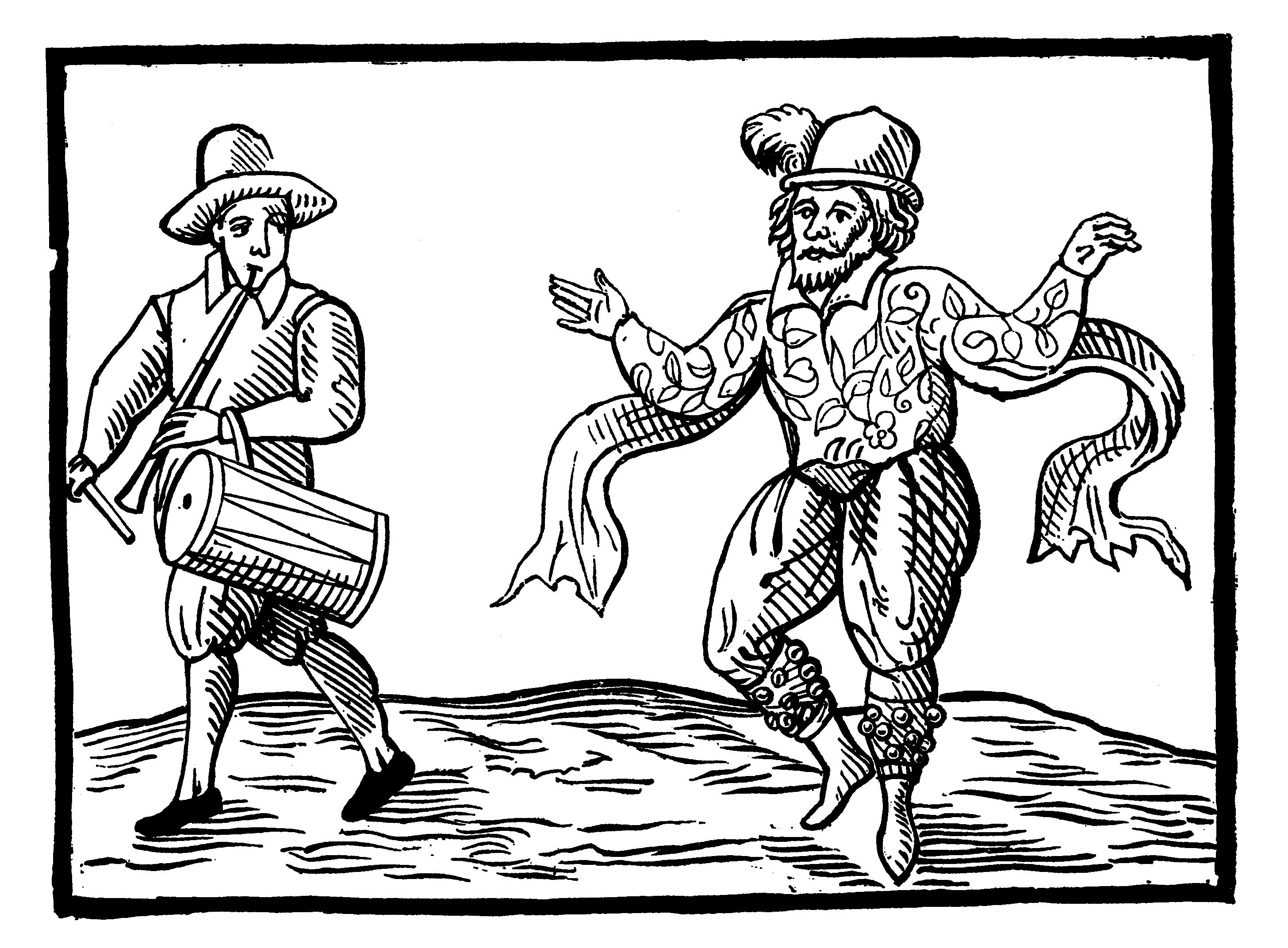
William Kempe (right)

In London's public playhouses there had been a competition or tension between the playwright's script, where the lines were written down and memorized, and the comedian players, who could get laughs with extemporaneous asides and by disrupting. There is a passage in Shakespeare's tragedy Hamlet, that indicates this. Hamlet, while welcoming a troupe of traveling players, discusses clowning:

...let those that play your clowns speak no more than is set down for them; for there be of them that will themselves laugh, to set on some quantity of barren spectators to laugh too, though in the meantime some necessary question of the play be then to be considered. That's villainous, and shows a most pitiful ambition in the fool that uses it.

In the 1590s this tension was negotiated by giving the comedians their own moment and their own space at the end of the performance. This practice developed, and during the last decade of the 16th century and into the 17th century, it became the jig in all of its variations, as one or more performers would sometimes reenter to perform an after-piece.

Often bawdy, sometimes satirical, usually comic, and something of the nature of farce, these sung-dramas, or playlets, drew their plots from folk tales, jest books, and Italian novellas and were populated by an assortment of traditional stock characters and tricksters, such as "cuckolds, rustic clowns, fools, bawdy wenches, enterprisingly faithless wives, gullible and cuckolded husbands, blustering soldiers, slippery gentlemen, foolish constables easily outwitted, prurient Puritans, falsely coy maidens and drunken foreigners".

Richard Tarlton is considered London's first great performer the theatrical jig. He was a celebrated actor, clown, and author; and he wrote a number of jigs. Next came Will Kempe, an actor of the time of William Shakespeare, who was as famous for his stage jigs as for his acting in regular drama. It is sometimes thought that when Kempe resigned from the Lord Chamberlain's Men in 1599, it indicated that jigs were falling out of favor. But there was still a demand for them until 1612 when there was an order to suppress them. A famous 17th-century jig called Kemp's Jig was named for him and was published almost a half century after Kempe in the first book of John Playford's The English Dancing Master of 1651.

The writing and performance of jigs was not just reserved for professionals on London stages. Two of the surviving jig scripts appear as evidence appended to the Bill of Complaint in two separate cases of libel brought before the court of Star Chamber in the early seventeenth century. The documents setting out the proceedings for the cases detail that the "libels" (verse that is sung of published in an attempt to defame a person's reputation) were written and performed by amateurs about the infamies of their neighbours and were sometimes taken up by semi-professional players and toured around towns and villages in England's localities.

The jig probably had some relationship to, the street-ballad or dialogue-ballad, which could easily be converted to a sung-drama by adding to the narrative of the ballad various elements such as props, settings, choreography, or mime. This process was quickened by the performing talents of certain celebrated players, such as Richard Tarlton, William Kemp and George Attowel.

By 1612, the Westminster Magistrates were so concerned by such post-play entertainment that they saw fit to issue an Order for suppressinge of Jigges att the ende of Playes, referring to "certayne lewde Jigges songes and daunces", and a year later Thomas Dekker, in Strange Horse-Race (1613), observes that in the open playhouses "the sceane, after the epilogue, hath been more black, about a nasty bawdy jigge" than any scene in the play. William Davenant, writing in The Unfortunate Lovers (performed 1638 [published 1643]), but looking back twenty years, says that attendants to the theatres would "expect a jig, or target fight".

== 16th- and 17th-century sources quoted ==
A number of references to theatre practices between 1590 and 1642 suggest the sort of post-play entertainment that might occur. For example, Thomas Nashe, in Pierce Penniless (1592), writes "the quaint comedians of our time/That when their play is done doe fall to ryme". In Have With You To Saffron Walden Or, Gabriell Harveys Hunt is Up (1596) Nashe threatens Gabriel Harvey with: "Comedie upon Comedie he shall have, a Morall, a Historie, a Tragedie, or what hee will . . . with a jigge at the latter end in English Hexameters of O neighbour Gabriell, and his wooing of Kate Cotton". In 1599, John Davies, in Epigrammes and Elegies (1599), suggests that "For as we see at all the play house dore,/When ended is the play, the daunce, and song,/A thousand townsmen, gentlemen, and whores,/Porters and serving-men together throng ... ", the same year that Thomas Platter, a Swiss-German tourist reports that "At the end of the play, as is customary, they danced quite elegantly, with two people dressed as men and two as women" and the next day, following a comedy, "they danced very charmingly in English and Irish fashion". Paulus Hentzner, a German traveller to England, also observes that the many tragedies and comedies performed in the theatres conclude by "mixing acrobatic dancing with the sweetest music, they can expect to receive the final reward of great popular applause" A year later, Ben Jonson, in Every Man Out of his Humour (1600; 2.1), talks of "as a jigge after a Play", as does John Marston who, in Jack Drum's Entertainment (1601), says that "the Iigge is cald for when the play is done". At the end of the sixteenth century, Jean Bodin in The Six Bookes of a Commonweale, Out of the French and Latine copies, done into English by Richard Knolles (1606), remarks that "now adayes they put at the end of euerie Tragedie (as poison into meat) a comedie or jigge"; and by 1611 Randle Cotgrave, in A Dictionarie of the French and English Tongues, defines French 'farce' by comparing it to "the Jyg at the end of an Enterlude, wherein some pretie knauerie is acted".

In Shakespeare's play, Hamlet, Polonius is insulted when Hamlet suggests that he'd prefer to see "a jig or a tale of bawdry" than a good play.

== Surviving texts ==
There are dialogue-ballads that have survived, some with the word jig in the title, and some that were featured in early modern plays; these were not stage jigs, but songs. A number of examples of stage jigs from the Tudor and Stuart period have survived as texts, and can be found spread across the collections at The Bodleian Library, The British Library, The National Library of Wales and Dulwich College Library.

The surviving texts of stage jigs feature between 3-6 male performers, some cross-dressed, in a sung-drama that on the page last between 10 and 25 minutes, but would have been extended in performance (the extant texts call for comic sword fighting, episodes of dance and comic routines) and include impromptu improvisation. They were probably related to French farce or sotie and Italian commedia dell'arte.

== See also ==
Entr'acte - interludes between acts, as opposed to at the end
