= William Kempe =

English actor and dancer (c. 1560–c. 1603)

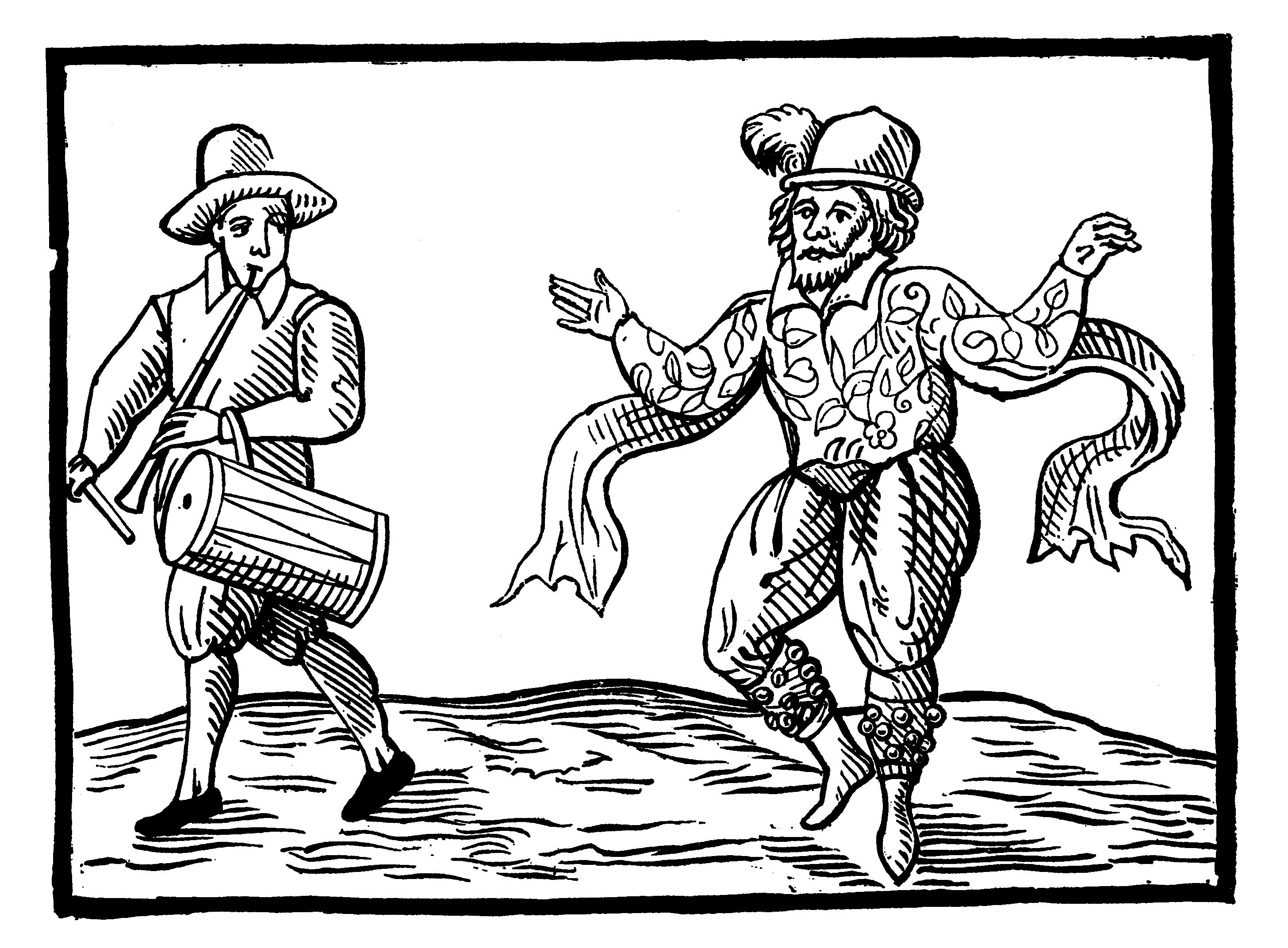
- Woodcut of Kempe (right) morris dancing from Kempes Nine Daies Wonder (1600)
- Born: c. 1560; Possibly Kent, England
- Died: c. 1603 (aged about 43); Southwark, London, England
- Occupation: actor
- Years active: 1585 or earlier–1603
- Known for: Playing comic roles in William Shakespeare's plays

William Kempe (c. 1560 – c. 1603), commonly referred to as Will Kemp, was an English actor and dancer who specialised in comic roles. He was best known as one of the original stage actors in early dramas by William Shakespeare, and roles associated with his name may have included the comic creation Falstaff. His contemporaries considered him to be a successor to the great clown of the previous generation, Richard Tarlton.

Kempe's success and influence was such that in December 1598 he was one of a core of five actor-shareholders in the Lord Chamberlain's Men, alongside Shakespeare and Richard Burbage. He left the company shortly afterwards, and despite his fame as a performer and his intention to continue his career, he appears to have died unregarded and in poverty circa 1603.

== Life ==
Kempe is usually given an approximate birth year of 1560. He first entered the historical record as a performer with Leicester's Men at Leicester House in May 1585 and continued in this service after Leicester's departure for the Low Countries to take part in the Eighty Years' War. Leicester's nephew, Philip Sidney, sent letters home by way of a man he called "Will, my Lord of Lester's jesting player" and it is now generally accepted this was Kempe. Sidney complained in a letter to Francis Walsingham that "Will" had delivered the letters to Lady Leicester rather than Sidney's wife, Frances Walsingham. After a brief return to England, Kempe accompanied two other future Lord Chamberlain's Men, George Bryan and Thomas Pope, to Elsinore where he entertained Frederick II of Denmark in 1586.

Kempe's whereabouts in the later 1580s are not known. His growing fame as a performer during this period is indicated by Thomas Nashe's An Almond for a Parrot (1590), which Nashe dedicated to Kempe, calling him "vicegerent general to the ghost of Dick Tarlton." The title-page of the quarto of A Knack to Know a Knave advertises Kempe's "merriments". Title-pages were a means to draw attention to a book, and the mention of Kempe suggests that he had become an attraction. Critics have generally viewed the scene in which Kempe performs as rather flat (Collier, 97), and it is assumed that the scene provided a framework within which Kempe could improvise. Entries in the Stationers' Register indicate that three jigs (short comic plays) possibly written by Kempe were published between 1591 and 1595. Two of these have survived.

By 1592 Kempe was one of Lord Strange's Men. He was listed in the Privy Council authorisation for that troupe to play seven miles out of London. In 1594, upon the dissolution of Strange's Men, Kempe, along with Burbage and Shakespeare, joined the Lord Chamberlain's Men and remained with them until early 1599, when events which are still unclear caused him to depart. Kemp had shared in the plans to construct the Globe Theatre but he appeared in no productions in the Globe, which was open by mid-1599. Evidence from Shakespeare's Henry V, in which there is no promised continuation of a role for Falstaff, and from Hamlet, with its complaint about improvised clowning (Act 3, Scene 2), may suggest the circumstances in which Kempe was dropped. He played his last role for Shakespeare in 1598.

In a 1615 lawsuit brought by Thomasina (née Heminges) Ostler, widow of William Ostler, against her father, John Heminges, the recently deceased actor William Kempe was referred to as a gentleman (Willelmo Kempe nuper de Londonia generoso defuncto). It has been suggested that either he was a member of the Kempe family of Olantigh, a property 1 mile (1.6 km) north of Wye in Kent, or pretended a connection.

Kemp's parentage is unknown, though it has been conjectured that, despite his plebeian performance persona, he was linked in some way to the Kempes of Ollantighe, near Ashford in Kent, who were a wealthy Catholic dynasty. Sir Thomas Kempe (1517–1591) did indeed have a son named William; however, the claim that this William Kempe was the actor cannot be correct, since he was buried at Wye church on 27 March 1597 (Honneyman, 125–9; Bannerman, 3; private information, A. Findlay) . Nonetheless, this putative connection might help explain the otherwise surprising story—dramatized in the play The Travailes of the Three English Brothers (1607) by Day, Rowley, and Wilkins—that when William Kemp the actor was in Italy in 1601 he had an encounter with the celebrated traveller Sir Anthony Shirley: for Sir Anthony and his two equally famous brothers were related to the Ollantighe Kempes through their mother, who was Sir Thomas Kempe's daughter. Possibly, then, the actor had some tie of kinship to Ollantighe, at an outlying point on the family tree; or perhaps in recommending himself to Shirley he was just opportunistically taking advantage of the name he shared with Shirley's mother.

== Final years ==
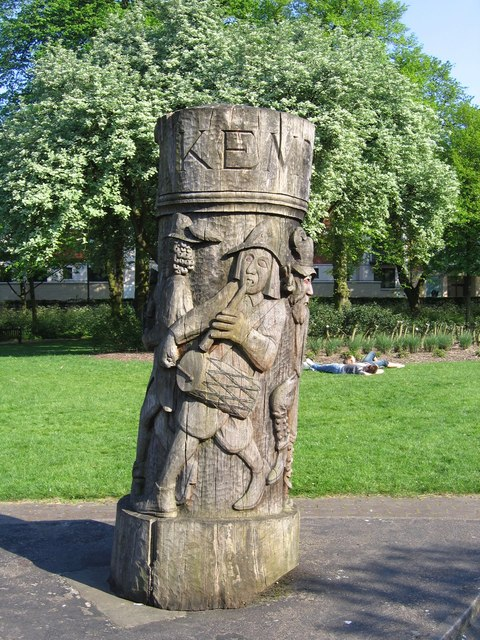
Wood carving of Kempe in Chapelfield Gardens, Norwich

After his departure from the Chamberlain's Men in early 1599, Kempe continued to pursue his career as a performer. In February and March 1600, he undertook an ordeal in which he morris danced from London to Norwich, a distance of about 110 miles or 177 km, a journey which took him nine days (spread over several weeks), often amid cheering crowds. Later that year he published a description of the event, Kempes Nine Daies Wonder, to prove to doubters that it was true. His later activities are obscure. On evidence from The Travels of the Three English Brothers, he is assumed to have made another European tour, perhaps reaching Italy, but by 1601 he was borrowing money from Philip Henslowe and had joined Worcester's Men. The last undoubted mention of him occurs in Henslowe's diary in late 1602.

The parish register of St. Saviour, Southwark, records the death of "William Kempe, a man" on 2 November 1603. While this is not necessarily the comedian, the record fits his departure from the documentary record.

== Performance style ==
Kempe was as famous for his stage jigs as for his acting in regular drama. The jig, a kind of rustic cousin to commedia dell'arte, featured as many as five performers in a partially improvised song-and-dance routine. Jigs had plots, often bawdy, but the emphasis was on dancing and physical comedy. Two of Kempe's jigs survive in English, and two more in German. Examples of the jigs may be seen in the manuscript collection of John Dowland (now in the Cambridge University Library). A famous 17th century jig tune called Kemp's Jig was named after Will Kempe and was published in the first book of John Playford's The English Dancing Master of 1651. The tune has received a number of modern renditions, including those by Jan Akkerman and the folk band Gryphon.

As an actor, Kempe is with certainty associated with two roles: Dogberry in Much Ado About Nothing and Peter in Romeo and Juliet. (In the quarto text of the latter, and in both quarto and First Folio text of the former, he is identified in speech prefixes and stage directions.) From these hints, a probable list of Kempe's parts has been deduced as follows: Costard in Love's Labours Lost, Bottom in A Midsummer Night's Dream, Lancelot Gobbo in The Merchant of Venice, and Cob in Ben Jonson's Every Man in His Humour. Falstaff is less certain. Although Falstaff presents some features of an Elizabethan dramatic clown, his character is higher in class and more complex than Kempe's other roles.

== In period fiction ==
- Kempe appears as a character in The Return from Parnassus, or The Scourge of Simony, possibly written during his lifetime or very shortly after his death. In it he praises Shakespeare for outdoing university-educated playwrights.

== In modern fiction ==
=== Film and TV ===
- In the 1978 TV series Will Shakespeare Kempe is portrayed by Derek Royle as an oafish alcoholic. He is ousted from the troupe and replaced by Robert Armin when they think he has betrayed their involvement in the Essex Rebellion. In fact Armin is the informer, who has framed Kempe to replace him.
- In the 1998 John Madden film Shakespeare in Love, he is played by Patrick Barlow.
- In 2005's TV-film A Waste of Shame he is portrayed by John Voce.
- In the 2007 Doctor Who episode "The Shakespeare Code", Kempe is played by David Westhead.
- In the 2016 BBC sitcom Upstart Crow, Kempe is played by Spencer Jones as a parody of modern comedian Ricky Gervais.
- In the 2017 television series Will, he is portrayed by William Houston.

=== Literature ===
- Kempe is the subject of Paul Aldred's 2022 novel for young adults Will Kempe, Clown, covering his last three years with the Lord Chamberlain's Company.
- Kempe is a key character in Kevin Sylvester's 2015 novel for young adults Neil Flambé and the Bard's Banquet, published by Simon & Schuster Books
- Kempe appears in Ann Young's 2002 novel for young adults The Nine Days Wonder, published by East Hall Press.
- In Neil Gaiman's 1991 graphic novel The Sandman: Dream Country, Kempe is depicted in the issue A Midsummer Night's Dream, a short story about Shakespeare's first performance of the play.
- Kempe also appears in King of Shadows, a 1999 children's fiction book which shows Kempe as a clown dancing a Nine Days' Morris.
- In Harry Turtledove's alternate history 2002 novel Ruled Britannia Kempe is one of the main characters. His off-stage personality is indistinguishable from the characters he plays on stage, and his antics provide much of the humour in the novel, which is set during a time of grim peril.
- In J. B. Cheaney's 2004 novel The True Prince along with more of the Lord Chamberlain's Men.
- Kempe's Jig is referenced in Geoffrey Hill's poem "After Reading Children of Albion (1969)" from his A Treatise of Civil Power, published in 2007.
- A fictionalized Kempe appears in Bernard Cornwall's 2017 novel Fools and Mortals, ISBN 9780007504114, 000750411X.

=== Stage ===
In 1973 Chris Harris began touring in "Kemp's Jig" a one-man humorous show describing Kemp's life and the Nine Days' Wonder. The play toured globally, with its performance at the National Theatre televised for LWT's Aquarius programme. In 2019 Blue Fire Theatre Company took over the production, which continues to tour with Steve Taylor playing Kemp.

- Kempe was the title character in Dan Roentsch's play Will Kemp.
- William Gibson depicts Kempe as a moody tragedian in his 1968 play A Cry of Players, a significant departure from Kempe's actual performance style.

In 2008, comedian Tim FitzHigham re-enacted Kemp's Nine Day's Wonder by Morris dancing from London to Norwich, forming the basis of his play The Bard's Fool, performed at the Edinburgh Fringe.

In 2021, Tortive Theatre launched a new one-actor play about the life and death of William Kempe, written by T.G Hofman, at the Edinburgh Fringe. Shakespeare's Fool starred Robin Leetham as Kempe and was directed by Ben Humphrey. The show started touring the UK in 2022.

=== Concerts ===
During the COVID-19 Lockdowns 2020–2021, Hexachordia, a musical trio, created KEMP'S JIG - a fifty-five minute "Docu-Concert" following the exploits of the Shakespearean comic actor and available to view online.
