= The Silver Belles =

American tap dance troupe

The Silver Belles were an American female tap dance troupe established in Harlem, New York City.

== Background ==
Group members included Marion Coles, Elaine Ellis, Cleo Hayes, Fay Ray, and Bertye Lou Wood. Managed by Geri Kennedy, The Silver Belles marked their return to the stage on June 8, 1986, at the Latin Quarter. They are featured in a 2006 documentary directed by Heather Lyn MacDonald, titled Been Rich All My Life.

== Members ==
Bertye Lou Wood (April 28, 1905 – March 7, 2002) was known as one of the great dancers of the Harlem Renaissance and helped other dancers by teaching them new steps, including fellow member of the Silver Belles, Marion Cole. Cole said, "She taught me how to dance, everything I know I owe to Bertye." Wood filmed the documentary Been Rich All My Life at age 95. From Newark, New Jersey, Wood started dancing in 1922 at the Lafayette Theater all the while raising her three boys. She left her husband to go out on her own. The dance director Addison Cary gave Wood her first big break. She danced with Bill Robinson on Broadway in Brown Buddies (1931), where she was among the first women to dance on stairs with him. In 1927, she made her debut at age 22, performing for the Lafayette and the Apollo Theater in the chorus line. She is also famous for dancing with Andy Kirk, Harry James, and the Jimmie Lunceford Band. Bertye Lou Wood and other dancers chipped in and bought Ella Fitzgerald her first evening gown because she did not have one. In the 1930s, Wood was the dance captain at the Apollo Theater where the young dancers first met. Wood led the Apollo Theater chorus line to strike for higher wages and a week's vacation pay on February 23, 1940. Sixteen chorus girls shut down the theater by refusing to go onstage and held a 24-hour picket line. The strike was the first for Black entertainers. The strike helped establish the American Guild of Variety Artists. They won a pay increase from $22.50 to $25 per week, extra time for rehearsals, and reduced working hours.

Marion Coles (March 15, 1915 – November 6, 2009) was born in Harlem, New York. Her father was in the navy and died at sea, leaving Marion and her mother behind. Every Sunday after church, Coles' mother taught her ballroom dancing. She started as a lindy hopper as a teenager at the Savoy and Renaissance Ballrooms in the 1930s. Her husband was the legendary tap dancer Charles Coles. She toured as a lindy hopper and joined the Apollo's Number One Chorus Line in 1936. Coles was a leader in the dancer's strike at the Apollo. She danced with "Round the World" tours and also toured with Leonard Reed. Marion became a dance teacher of rhythm dance, black chorus line style, and taught tap seminars across the country. She was known for mentally choreographing and practicing dance routines, and to physically perform the steps afterwards. In 2002, Coles was awarded an honorary degree from Queens College for her dedication to her students. She was also the dance director of the Silver Belles.

Elaine Ellis (November 30, 1917 – December 21, 2013) was born in Panama and traveled to New York with her family at a young age. She started dancing in response to an advertisement searching for Spanish dancers. She learned how to dance from both chorus girls and men tap dancers. When the Cotton Club closed, she danced at Café Zanzibar, Club Mimo, the Lenox Lounge, and the Apollo Theater. She also danced at Paradise Club, Harlem Club in Atlantic City, and Rhum Boogie in Chicago. In an interview, Ellis cites Small's Paradise on 135th and 7th as The Silver Belles organization spot. After she gave up dancing, she raised two children, and worked as a bartender and bar manager.

Cleo Hayes (August 19, 1914 – May 23, 2012) was born in Greenville, Mississippi. She moved to Chicago with the hopes of becoming a star and landed her first job at the Grand Terrace with Earl Hines. In New York, she worked at Small's Paradise which, unlike most clubs, catered to Black people. When someone from the newly opened Apollo Theater asked her to join the chorus line, she became an 'Apollo Theater Rockette.' After her time at the Apollo, she joined the Cotton Club, where Bertye Lou Wood worked at the time. In 1938, Hayes and Wood danced on tour in South America. After Pearl Harbor was bombed, they toured with the first Black USO unit during the Second World War. Hayes recalled the racial prejudice she experienced on these tours in the South. During their tours in the south, they received their meals out back doors of mess halls. In the documentary, she spoke about her own resistance against segregation by taking a 'whites only' sign off a train with her. After war jobs declined for dancers, she continued to work at Broadway's Café Zanzibar, the 845 Club, toured with Cab Calloway, and starred in the film Stormy Weather. Throughout her dancing career and after, she worked as a barmaid.

Fay Ray (September 11, 1919 – September 14, 2013) was born in Louisiana and wanted to be a dancer from a young age. At age 12, she jumped on a freight train dressed as a boy and left her hard childhood of picking cotton. She made it the Shreveport where she lived and worked. She joined a group from Kansas City who were looking for young dancers. She traveled the country as a singer and dancer on the vaudeville circuit. She learned the trade from her mentor Carnel Lions, one of the three "Business Men of Rhythm." At 16, she ventured out with a solo act. At 18, she tried out an act in front of Leonard Reed who called her a bitch for mimicking his moves so well and hired her. In the 1940s, she moved to New York where she worked at the Café Zanzibar, Club Ebony and the 845. During the Second World War, Ray became a certified welder, building ships for the Navy. After theaters in the United States closed, she went abroad where she produced shows. She danced and told jokes with USO tours in the 1960s in Paris, Beirut, Egypt, and Tokyo. She did not stop until she was 50 years old. When she returned to the United States, she worked as a taxi driver in New York City, and then, worked on the pipeline in Alaska.

Geraldine "Geri" Rhodes Kennedy (July 12, 1930 – November 16, 2017) was born in Monroe Township, North Carolina. Kennedy was the manager of The Silver Belles. Working as a barmaid in Harlem, Kennedy became interested in the chorus girls after hearing stories from former dancers such as Edna "Yak" Taylor. She became inspired to form the group while she was working as a road manager for the rhythm and blues group Sister Sledge, a group formed by her nieces who toured in American and Europe. During the 1970s, Kennedy recruited former dancers as part of a benefit for senior citizens, known as the Swinging Seniors. She always considered the chorus girls the stars of the show from the 1920s to the 1940s. Chorus girls created a new show every week but no one has ever heard about them. Kennedy wanted to make sure Chorus girls received their due recognition and were able to continue to use their talents until they no longer could. The Silver Belles performed to raise awareness of the long history of black women dance and raise money for charity, particularly for children and senior citizens.
