= Old measures =

Dances made for festivals

Old measures, or simply measures, are a group of dances that were performed at ceremonial and festive occasions in Early Modern Britain. Some of the dances included in the measures were the pavane and the almain, and dances such as the galliard and the courante are also mentioned as accompanying or following the traditional measures.

The measures are associated with the Inns of Court, the English law schools, as most of the extant sources have been found among the papers of lawyers and law students at the Inns. They are also mentioned in Shakespeare plays such as As You Like It (Act V, scene 4), Richard II (Act III, scene 4), Richard III (Act I, scene 1) and Much Ado About Nothing (Act II, Scene 1).

One must be wary when one encounters 16th- and 17th-century references to measure or measures, as a measure could refer to a bar, or generically to dancing, as well as to this specific group of dances.

== Dances ==
While sources differ in some of the details, and not all contain all the dances, the vast majority describe the following dances in the following order (alman, almaine, alleymayne, etc. refer to the same dance type):

- Quadran Pavan
- Turkeylone
- Earl of Essex (or Earl of Essex Measure)
- Tinternell
- Old Alman
- Queen's Almaine
- Madam Sosilia Alman (or Madam Cecilia Alman)
- Black Almaine

== Manuscript sources ==
- Bodleian Library, MS. Rawl. Poet. 108 (c. 1570)
- British Library, Harley MS 367
- Bodleian Library, MS. Douce 280 (c. 1606)
- Bodleian Library, MS. Rawl. D. 864 (c. 1630)
- Inner Temple Library, Miscellanea Vol. XXVII (mid to late 17th century)
- Royal College of Music, Ms. 1119 (mid to late 17th century)

== Bibliography ==
Research on the measures has advanced significantly in the last three decades, and readers are advised to consult the most recent works.

- Brissenden, Alan. Shakespeare and the Dance. New Jersey: Humanities Press, 1981.
- Cunningham, James. Dancing in the Inns of Court. London: Jordan & Sons, Ltd., 1965. (Wilson’s edition has replaced Cunningham’s transcriptions of the dances.)
- Durham, Peter and Janelle. "The Old Measures - 1570 - 1675." 2001. Companion CD by Jouissance: Dances from the Inns of Court, London 1570 - 1675."
- Mullally, Robert. “Measure as a Choreographic Term in the Stuart Masque.” Dance Research 16.1 (Summer 1998): 67-73.
- Mullally, Robert. “More about the measures.” Early Music 22.3 (August 1994): 417-438.
- Payne, Ian. The Almain in Britain, c. 1549-c. 1675: A Dance Manual from Manuscript Sources. Hampshire, UK: Ashgate Publishing Ltd., 2003.
- Stokes, James, and Ingrid Brainard. “'The olde Measures' in the West Country: John Willoughby's manuscript.” Records of Early English Drama Newsletter 17.2 (1992): 1-10.
- Ward, John. “The olde Measures.” Records of Early Drama Newsletter 18.1 (1993): 2-21.
- Welsford, Enid. The Court Masque: A Study in the Relationship between Poetry & The Revels. Cambridge: Russell & Russell Inc., 1962.
- Wienpahl, Robert. Music at the Inns of Court: During the reigns of Elizabeth, James, and Charles. Ann Arbor, Michigan: University Microfilms International, 1979.
- Wilson, David R. “Dancing in the Inns of Court.” Historical Dance 2.5 (1986-1987): 3-16.
- Wilson, David R. “The Old Measures and the Inns of Court: a note.” Historical Dance 3.3 (1994): 24.
