= Sanding (dance) =

Type of dance performed on sand

Sanding, also known as sand jigging or sand dancing, is a type of dance performed as a series of slides and shuffles on a sand-strewn floor. In some instances, the sand is spread across an entire stage. In other cases, it is kept in a box that the dancer stays in throughout the dance. Originally a soft-shoe technique, scratching in sand can also add a different texture to the percussion of tap. There is no one type of shoe used to sand dance; traditional tap shoes are used alongside soft shoes and leather boots, all creating a distinctive sound. Willie "The Lion" Smith said of sanding, "You could really hear and feel the rhythm when the dancers shuffled around in a nice pair of patent-leather shoes".

The early history of sand dancing is obscure but it seems to have developed as a variant of what in the 19th century was known as "jig dancing" or, more precisely, "straight jig" dancing (to distinguish it from Irish and Scottish dances in 6/8 time). As with other forms of variety theatre and minstrel show dancing, straight and sand jig technique developed as white dancers familiar with Irish or British jigs, reels and hornpipes tried to emulate the steps of African-American dancers whose style had pronounced African roots.

The most prominent stage sand dancers of the mid- to late-19th century were two white New Yorkers: Kitty O'Neil and her rival Kitty Sharpe. Sharpe learned the dance from the Hawley Brothers, a blackface minstrel dance team, but her performances, like those of Kitty O'Neil, were not done in blackface. White male sand dancers in minstrelsy, variety or vaudeville did, however, frequently don blackface. This practice was recreated in the 1951 film Yes Sir, Mr. Bones, in which the veteran minstrel Ned Haverly (of Haverly's United Mastodon Minstrels) performed a sand dance as a grotesque caricature of an African American.

Early straight jig dancers would scatter sand on wooden floors for traction, as was done at a famous 1862 competition between Dick Carroll and Tommy Peel. Carroll, Peel and their jigging and clogging contemporaries were percussive dancers but their use of sand made possible the addition of the sliding and shuffling steps of true sand dancing.

The music played for 19th-century variety theater sand dancers was in 2/2 time in schottische tempo, but with a great deal of syncopation. Sand dancers kept their upper body still. As Kitty Sharpe told a journalist: "With that kind of dancing the more immobile you are from your hips up the better you are. I could dance with a glass of water on my head, and have, many times." A 1942 New York Post article noted that African-American tap star John Bubbles' sand dancing was "a sort of rhythmic, swishing shuffle" and that "practically all the action is from the ankles down, with the dancer's feet never leaving the ground." Sand dancers didn't cover a lot of ground. A writer in the New York Sun in 1917 recalled that decades earlier Kitty O'Neil "...used to step from the wings of Pastor’s Theatre attired in tights and shake a paper bag full of white sand on the stage. She confined her efforts within the limited sand zone, which covered but a few feet." John Bubbles used only about a two-foot square area for his routine. In recent decades, sand dancers have often confined the sand to a wooden box in order to avoid abrading the actual stage.

Sand dancing was a specialty act for many variety theatre, vaudeville and music hall performers. Harry Swinton, who starred in a 1900 revival of the 1892 drama In Old Kentucky, was known as a great sand dancer. Eubie Blake said that “[Swinton] did more just spreading the sand than other dancers could do with their whole act.”. Vaudeville and Hollywood star George Burns kept sand dancing in his repertoire for decades.

The English trio of Wilson, Keppel and Betty were particularly well known for a routine "Cleopatra's Nightmare" (aka "Sand Dance"), in which they spread sand over the entire stage. The act had a pseudo-Egyptian theme with no overt reference to minstrelsy or African-American tradition. But their interpretation also emphasized the sliding and shuffling of feet across the stage, creating the sound unique to this style. This dance became a favorite among fans and is arguably what Wilson, Keppel and Betty are best known for.

If sand dancing was once associated with white or blackface stage performers, it was kept alive after the decline of vaudeville by African-American dancers. The most prominent sand dancers of the past century have been African-Americans. In addition to John Bubbles (who taught the technique to Fred Astaire), prominent black sand dancers included Bill "Bojangles" Robinson, Sammy Davis Jr., Harriet Browne and, especially, Howard "Sandman" Sims, long-time MC of the famous amateur shows at the Apollo Theater in Harlem, New York City. Sims brought an interpretation of sand dancing into the mainstream that was not based on street dancing or historical variety/vaudeville style. Rather, his dancing was a product of his training as a boxer, specifically his shuffling around in the box of rosin before matches to improve his grip. Sims' popularity as a tap dancer and long career at the Apollo made him the most influential sand dancer of modern times.
