= The Dancing Master =

Dancing manual by John Playford

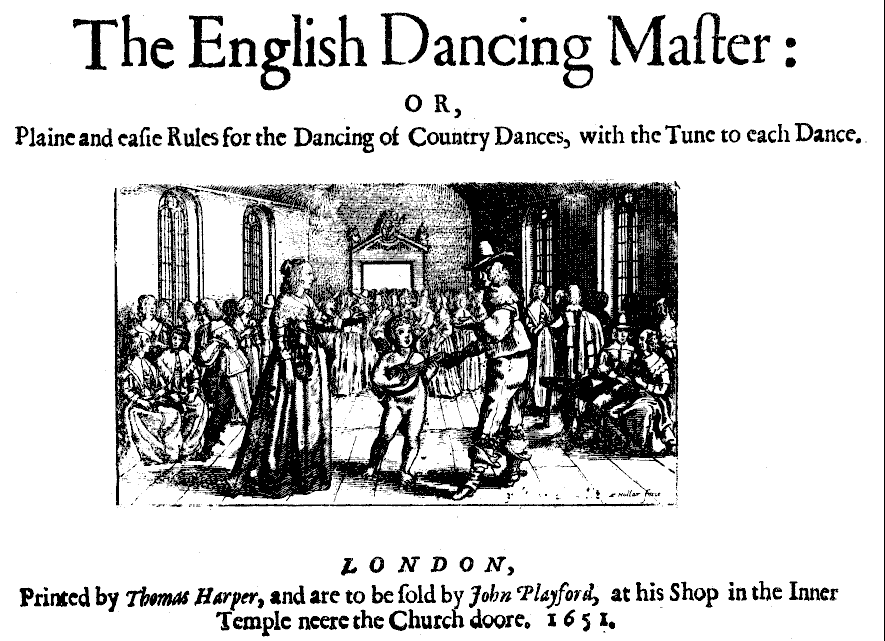
Title page of the 1st edition (1651), with a long s, (ſ)

The Dancing Master (first edition: The English Dancing Master) is a dancing manual containing the music and instructions for English country dances. It was first published in 1651 by the London-based publisher and composer John Playford. The book had at least 18 editions between 1651 and 1728. Several supplements and continuations were also published during this period.

== History ==
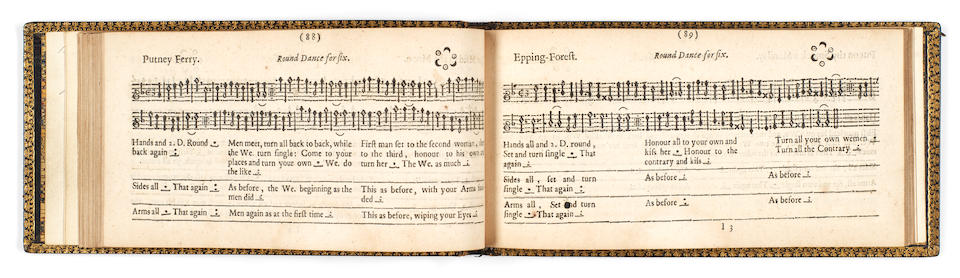
The Dancing Master from 1675

It was published in several editions by John Playford and his successors from 1651 until c. 1728. The first edition contained 105 dances with single-line melodies. The 1651 book The Dancing Master by John Playford had been designed for teaching dancing. It was originally small so that the dancing master could hide it under his cloak and consult it surreptitiously. Subsequent editions introduced new songs and dances, while dropping others, and the work eventually encompassed three volumes.

Dances from The Dancing Master were re-published in arrangements by Cecil Sharp in the early 20th century. In 1957 Margaret Dean Smith completed her facsimile book Playford's English Dancing Master. This work had been the first publication of English dance tunes and her publication established her as the expert on this work.

Dances from the book, in reconstructed forms, remain popular among dancers today. Early versions of the book are rare and command high prices.

== Known editions and supplements ==
Performances of guitar arrangements of three pieces, with score images

"Jamaica" from the 4th edition
On a vihuela

"Grimstock"
MIDI representation

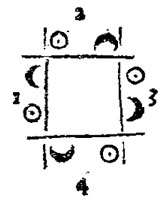
Square dance diagram from The Dancing Master

- 1651 – 1st edition (the only edition to be called The English Dancing Master, published by John Playford)
- 1652 – 2nd edition
- 1657 – 3rd edition
- 1665 – 3rd edition
- 1670 – 4th edition
- 1675 – 5th edition
- 1679 – 6th edition
- 1679 – A Supplement to The Dancing-Master
- 1686 – 7th edition
- 1687? – Tunes of other Country-Dances
- 1688? – A new Additional Sheet to the Dancing-Master
- 1689? – A new Addition to the Dancing-Master
- 1690 – 8th edition (the first marked as published by Henry Playford)
- 1695 – 9th edition
- 1696 – The second Part of the Dancing Master
- 1698 – The Second Part of the Dancing Master, 2nd edition
- 1698? – [Untitled supplement]
- 1698? – An Additional Sheet to the Second Part of the Dancing-Master
- 1698 – 10th edition
- 1701 – 11th edition
- 1702 – Twenty Four New Country Dances. Printed by William Pearson for Henry Playford
- 1703 – 12th edition
- 1706 – 13th edition (the first edition published by John Young)
- 1709 – 14th edition
- 1710? – Vol. the second, 1st edition
- 1713 – 15th edition
- 1714? – Vol. the second, 2nd edition
- 1716 – 16th edition
- 1718 – Vol. the second, 3rd edition
- 1721 – Vol. the first, 17th edition
- c1726 – The Third Volume, 2nd edition
- c1728 – Vol. the first, 18th edition
- 1728 – Vol. the second, 4th edition

== See also ==
- Jig (theatre)
