= 1979 =

1979 in various calendars
- Gregorian calendar: 1979; MCMLXXIX
- Ab urbe condita: 2732
- Armenian calendar: 1428; ԹՎ ՌՆԻԸ
- Assyrian calendar: 6729
- Baháʼí calendar: 135–136
- Balinese saka calendar: 1900–1901
- Bengali calendar: 1385–1386
- Berber calendar: 2929
- British Regnal year: 27 Eliz. 2 – 28 Eliz. 2
- Buddhist calendar: 2523
- Burmese calendar: 1341
- Byzantine calendar: 7487–7488
- Chinese calendar: 戊午年 (Earth Horse); 4676 or 4469 — to — 己未年 (Earth Goat); 4677 or 4470
- Coptic calendar: 1695–1696
- Discordian calendar: 3145
- Ethiopian calendar: 1971–1972
- Hebrew calendar: 5739–5740
- Hindu calendars
- Vikram Samvat: 2035–2036
- Shaka Samvat: 1900–1901
- Kali Yuga: 5079–5080
- Holocene calendar: 11979
- Igbo calendar: 979–980
- Iranian calendar: 1357–1358
- Islamic calendar: 1399–1400
- Japanese calendar: Shōwa 54 (昭和５４年)
- Javanese calendar: 1910–1912
- Juche calendar: 68
- Julian calendar: Gregorian minus 13 days
- Korean calendar: 4312
- Minguo calendar: ROC 68 民國68年
- Nanakshahi calendar: 511
- Thai solar calendar: 2522
- Tibetan calendar: ས་ཕོ་རྟ་ལོ་ (male Earth-Horse); 2105 or 1724 or 952 — to — ས་མོ་ལུག་ལོ་ (female Earth-Sheep); 2106 or 1725 or 953
- Unix time: 283996800 – 315532799

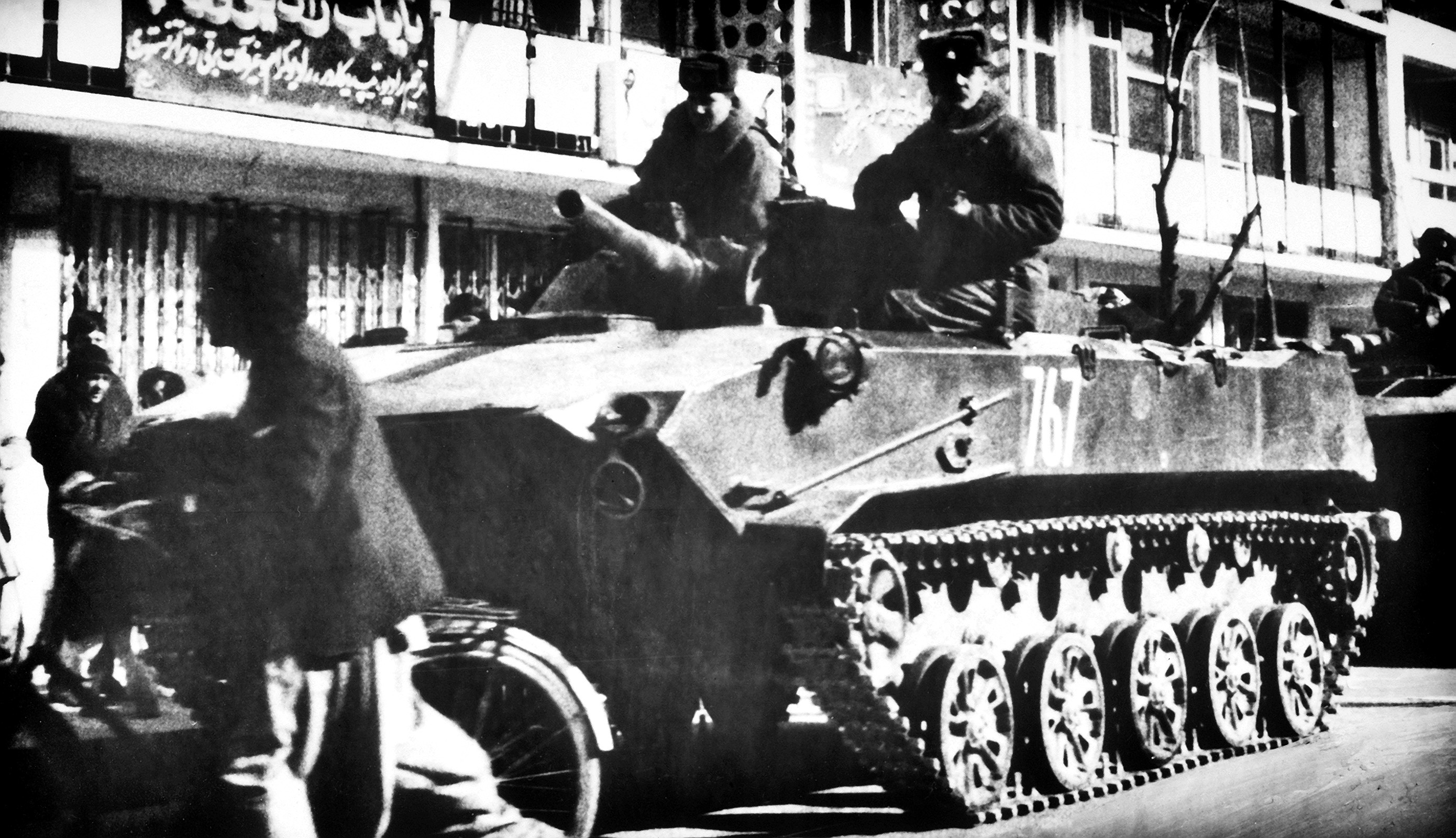
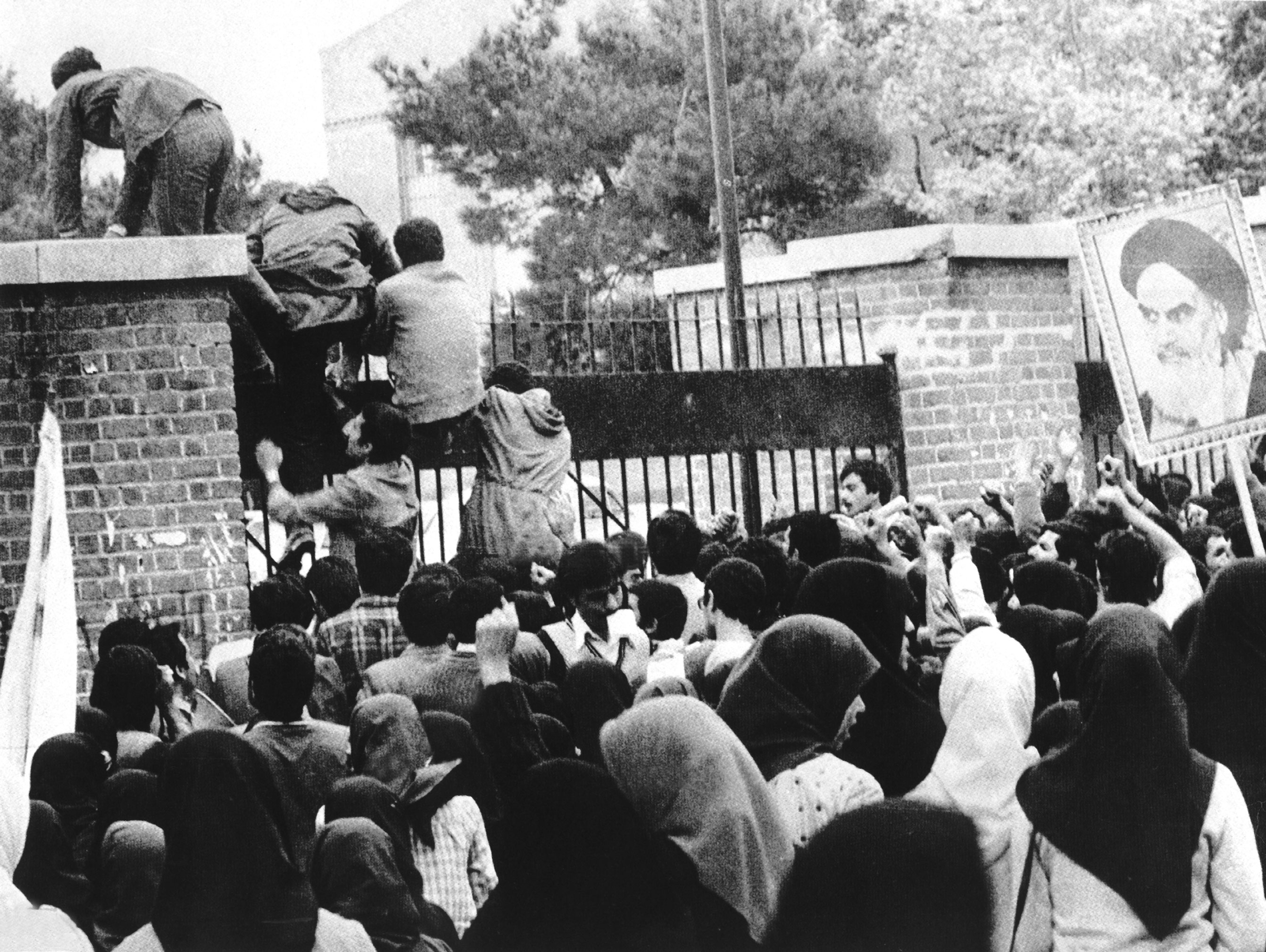
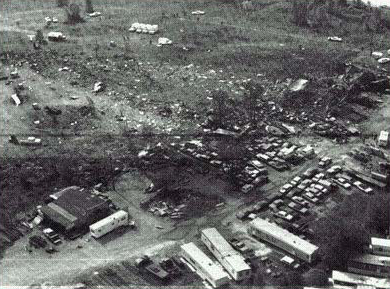
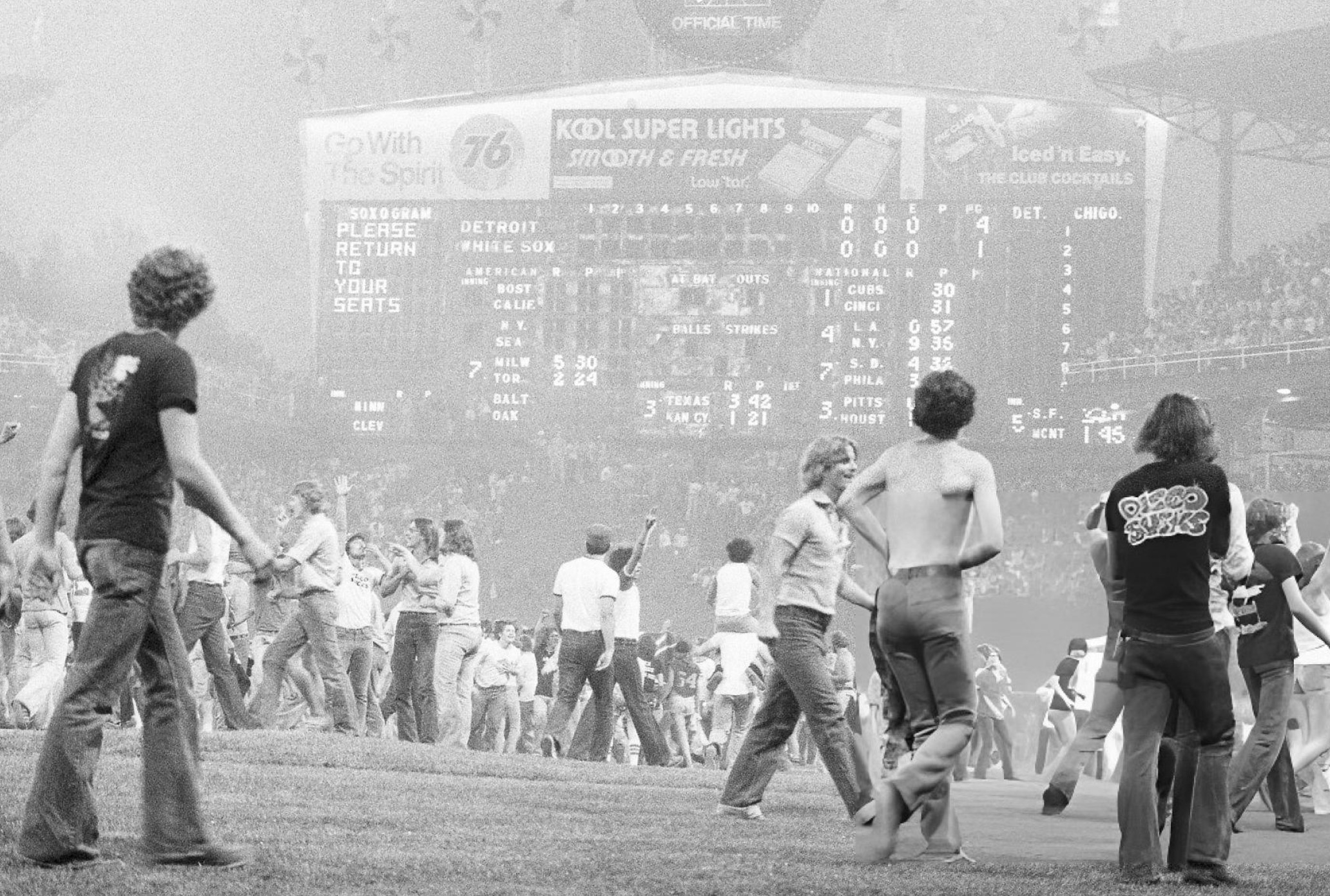
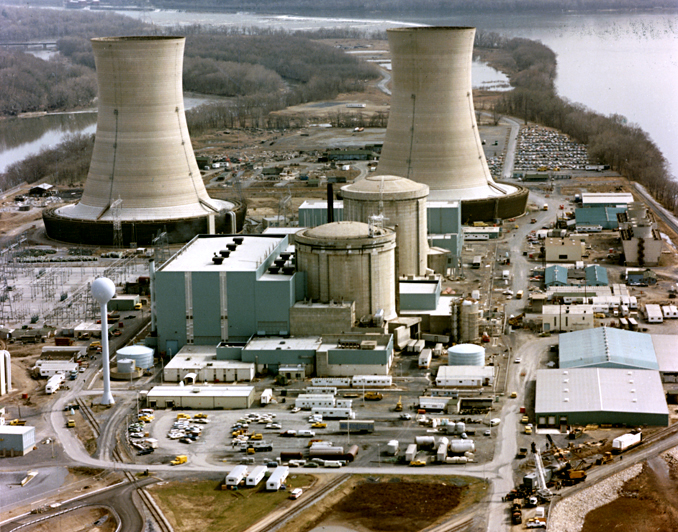
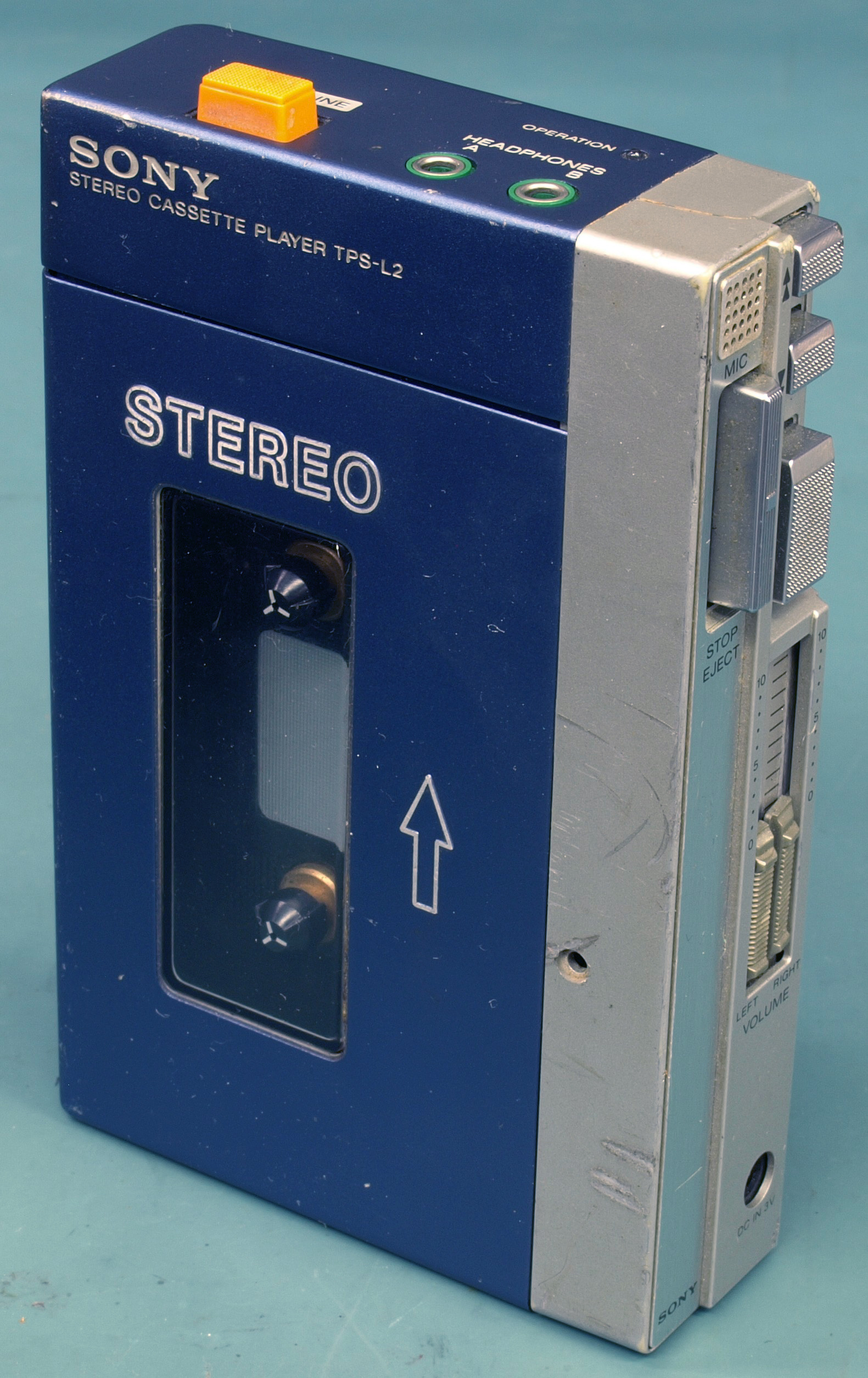
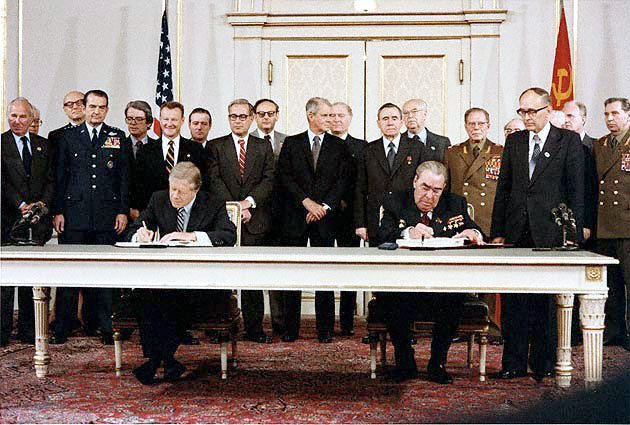
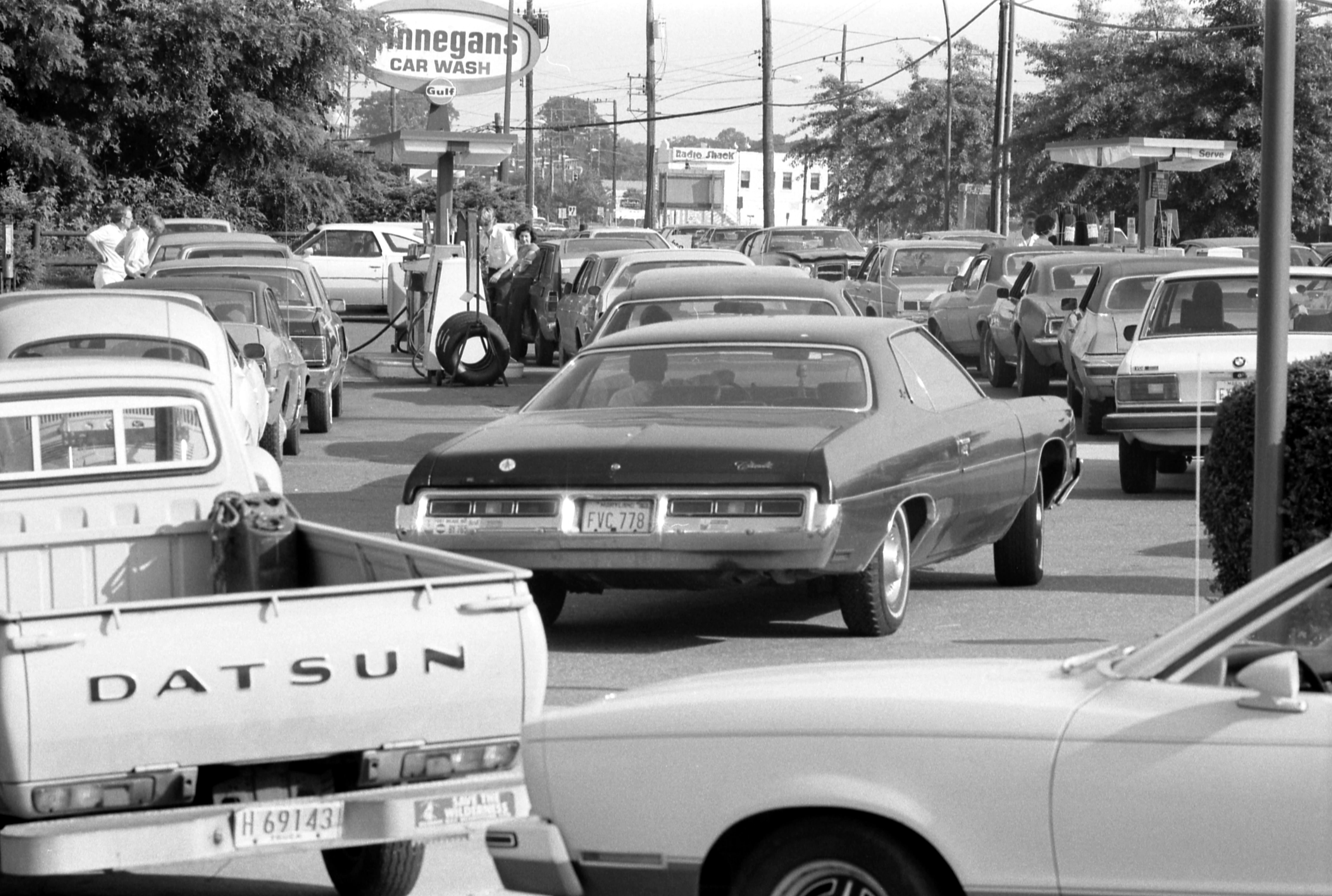
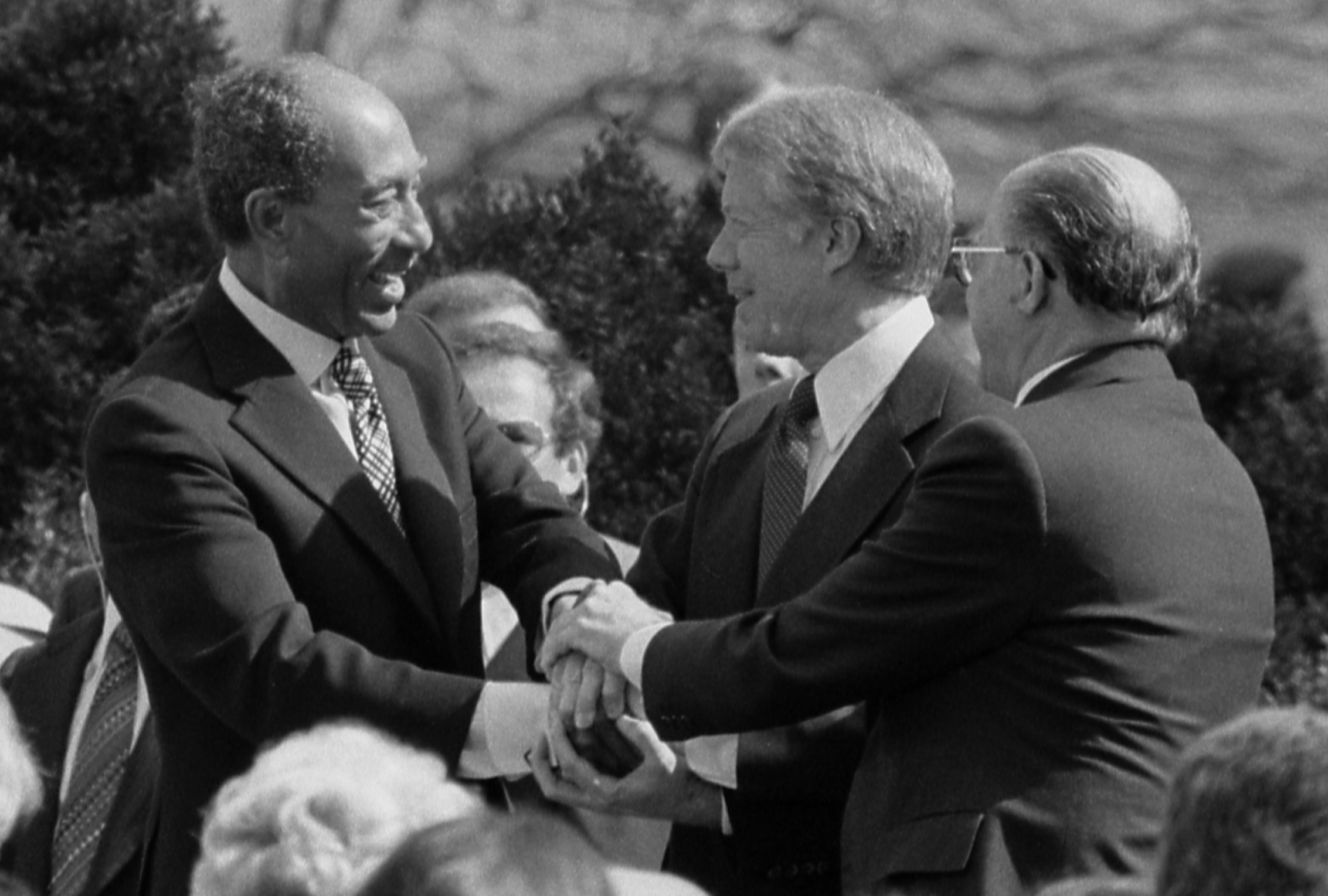
From top to bottom, left to right: the Soviet–Afghan War begins as the Soviet Union invades Afghanistan; the Iran hostage crisis erupts when militants seize the U.S. embassy in Tehran; American Airlines Flight 191 crashes in Chicago, killing 271; Disco Demolition Night at Comiskey Park turns into a riot; the Three Mile Island accident causes a partial nuclear meltdown; the Sony Walkman debuts; SALT II is signed to limit nuclear arms; the 1979 oil crisis sends fuel prices soaring; and the Egypt–Israel peace treaty is signed, marking the first peace deal between Israel and an Arab nation.

1979 (MCMLXXIX) was a common year starting on Monday of the Gregorian calendar, the 1979th year of the Common Era (CE) and Anno Domini (AD) designations, the 979th year of the 2nd millennium, the 79th year of the 20th century, and the 10th and last year of the 1970s decade.

== Events ==
=== January ===
- January 1
  - United Nations Secretary-General Kurt Waldheim heralds the start of the International Year of the Child. Many musicians donate to the Music for UNICEF Concert fund, among them ABBA, who write the song Chiquitita to commemorate the event.
  - In 1979, the United States officially severed diplomatic ties with the Republic of China (Taiwan). This decision marked a significant shift in U.S. foreign policy, turning to view the People's Republic of China as the sole legitimate representative of China.
  - The United States and the People's Republic of China establish full diplomatic relations.
  - Following a deal agreed during 1978, French carmaker Peugeot completes a takeover of American manufacturer Chrysler's European operations, which are based in Britain's former Rootes Group factories, as well as the former Simca factories in France.
- January 6 – Geylang Bahru family murders: Four children, aged five to ten, are brutally killed in Geylang Bahru, Singapore.
- January 7 – Cambodian–Vietnamese War: The People's Army of Vietnam and Vietnamese-backed Cambodian insurgents announce the fall of Phnom Penh, Cambodia, and the collapse of the Pol Pot regime. Pol Pot and the Khmer Rouge retreat west to an area along the Thai border, ending large-scale fighting.
- January 8 – Whiddy Island Disaster: The French tanker Betelgeuse explodes at the Gulf Oil terminal at Bantry, Ireland; 50 people are killed.
- January 9 – The Music for UNICEF Concert is held at the United Nations General Assembly to raise money for UNICEF and promote the Year of the Child. It is broadcast the following day in the United States and around the world. Hosted by the Bee Gees, other performers include Donna Summer, ABBA, Rod Stewart and Earth, Wind & Fire. A soundtrack album is later released.
- January 16 – Shah Mohammad Reza Pahlavi flees Iran with his family, relocating to Egypt after a year of turmoil.
- January 19 – Former U.S. Attorney General John N. Mitchell is released on parole after 19 months at a federal prison in Alabama.
- January 20 – Capital punishment in Peru: Following a hasty conviction on espionage and treason charges, Air Force member Julio Vargas Garayar became the last person to be executed by Peru.
- January 22 – Uganda–Tanzania War: Battle of Mutukula: The Tanzanian military captures the Ugandan border town of Mutukula after a short battle.
- January 25 – Pope John Paul II arrives in Mexico City for his first visit to Mexico, mainly for 1979's Latin American Episcopal Conference (CELAM) or Conference of Puebla.
- January 28 – Deng Xiaoping arrives in Washington, D.C., for the first visit of a paramount leader of the People's Republic of China to the United States.

=== February ===
22 February: Saint Lucia becomes independent

Flag of the Islamic Republic of Iran

- February 1 – Ayatollah Ruhollah Khomeini returns to Tehran, Iran after nearly 15 years of exile.
- February 3 – Ayatollah Khomeini creates the Council of the Islamic Revolution.
- February 7
  - Iranian Revolution: Supporters of Ayatollah Khomeini take over the Iranian law enforcement, courts, and government administration; the final session of the Iranian National Consultative Assembly is held.
  - Pluto moves inside Neptune's orbit for the first time since either was known to science.
  - Nazi criminal Josef Mengele suffers a fatal stroke and drowns while swimming in Bertioga, Brazil. His remains are found in 1985.
- February 10–11 – The Iranian Revolution ends with the Iranian army withdrawing to its barracks leaving power in the hands of Ayatollah Khomeini, ending the Pahlavi dynasty.
- February 11 – Uganda–Tanzania War: Battle of Simba Hills: The Tanzanian military began its assault on the Simba Hills near the town of Kakuuto.
- February 12 – Prime Minister Hissène Habré starts the Battle of N'Djamena in an attempt to overthrow Chad's President Félix Malloum.
- February 13
  - An intense windstorm strikes western Washington and sinks a 1.3 km (0.81 mi) long section of the Hood Canal Bridge.
  - The Guardian Angels are formed in New York City as an unarmed organization of young crime fighters.
- February 14 – In Kabul, Muslim extremists kidnap the American ambassador to Afghanistan, Adolph Dubs, who is killed during a gunfight between his kidnappers and police.
- February 15 – A suspected gas explosion in a Warsaw bank kills 49 people.
- February 17 – The People's Republic of China invades northern Vietnam, launching the Sino-Vietnamese War.
- February 18
  - The 1979 Daytona 500 is televised on CBS, the first ever full airing of a 500-mile race on US television, Richard Petty wins after Cale Yarborough and Donnie Allison battle for first place on the final lap and crash out, leading to a fist fight. This race brought NASCAR to a wider audience.
  - The Khomeini government in Iran cuts diplomatic relations with Israel.
- February 21 – Uganda–Tanzania War: Battle of Gayaza Hills: A Tanzanian brigade successfully dislodged Ugandan forces from the Gayaza Hills. The battle is hard-fought, and the Tanzanians suffer their largest number of casualties in a single engagement of the war.
- February 22 – Saint Lucia becomes independent from the United Kingdom.
- February 26
  - A total solar eclipse, the last visible from the continental United States until 2017, arcs over northwestern conterminous US and central Canada ending in Greenland. A partial solar eclipse is visible over almost all of North America and Central America including the eastern half of Alaska and the western half of the UK.
  - The Superliner railcar enters revenue service with Amtrak.
- February 27
  - The annual Mardi Gras celebration in New Orleans is cancelled due to a strike called by the New Orleans Police Department.
  - The Soviet oil tanker Antonio Gramsci suffers a minor shipwreck in shallow waters shortly after leaving shore in Ventspils, resulting in a 5,000 ton oil spill, the largest that has ever occurred on the Baltic Sea.

=== March ===
- March 1
  - Scottish devolution referendum: Scotland votes in favour of a Scottish Assembly, which is not implemented due to failing a condition that at least 40% of the electorate must support the proposal; in a Welsh devolution referendum, Wales votes against devolution.
  - Philips publicly demonstrate a prototype of an optical digital audio disc at a press conference in Eindhoven, Netherlands.
- March 2 – Uganda–Tanzania War: Battle of Tororo: Ugandan rebels attack and capture the town of Tororo.
- March 4
  - The U.S. Voyager 1 spaceprobe photos reveal Jupiter's rings.
  - Uganda–Tanzania War: Battle of Tororo: The Ugandan military retakes Tororo from rebels.
- March 5 – Voyager 1 makes its closest approach to Jupiter at 277,000 kilometres (172,000 mi).
- March 7 – The largest Magnetar (Soft gamma repeater) event is recorded.
- March 8
  - Philips demonstrates the compact disc publicly for the first time.
  - Thousands of women participate in the International Women's Day Protests in Tehran, 1979 against the introduction of mandatory veiling during the Iranian revolution.
  - Images taken by Voyager 1 prove the existence of volcanoes on Io, a moon of Jupiter.
- March 10 – Uganda–Tanzania War: Battle of Lukaya: The Ugandan military, a Libyan expeditionary force and allied Palestine Liberation Organisation militants begin a counter-offensive against Tanzanian troops in south-central Uganda. The Ugandan-led alliance retakes Lukaya after a short clash with the Tanzanian military.
- March 11 – Uganda–Tanzania War: Battle of Lukaya: The Tanzanian military counter-attacks at Lukaya, completely defeating the Ugandan-led alliance. This defeat permanently cripples the Ugandan military.
- March 13 – Maurice Bishop leads a successful coup in Grenada. His government will be crushed by American intervention in 1983.
- March 14 – In China, a Hawker Siddeley Trident crashes into a factory near Beijing, killing 31 people on the ground and injuring 200.
- March 16
  - End of major hostilities in the Sino-Vietnamese War.
  - In his letter to the United Nations, Elisio De Figueiredo, the People's Republic of Angola's Permanent Representative to the United Nations, requests an urgent meeting of the United Nations Security Council on the question of South Africa's continuous acts of aggression in Angola.
- March 17 – The Penmanshiel Tunnel in the UK collapses, killing two workers.
- March 19 – C-SPAN, an American television channel focusing on government and public affairs, is launched.
- March 18 – Ten miners die in a methane gas explosion at Golborne Colliery near Wigan, Greater Manchester, England.
- March 22 – The National Hockey League votes to approve its merger with the World Hockey Association, to take effect in three months, following the leagues' respective postseasons.
- March 25 – The first fully functional Space Shuttle orbiter, Columbia, is delivered to the Kennedy Space Center, to be prepared for its first launch.
- March 26
  - In a ceremony at the White House, President Anwar Sadat of Egypt and Prime Minister Menachem Begin of Israel sign an Egypt–Israel peace treaty.
  - Michigan State University, led by Earvin "Magic" Johnson, defeats Larry Bird-led Indiana State 75–64 in the NCAA tournament championship game at Salt Lake City.
- March 28
  - In Britain, James Callaghan's minority Labour government loses a motion of confidence by one vote, forcing a general election which is to be held on 3 May.
  - America's most serious nuclear power plant accident occurs, at Three Mile Island, Pennsylvania.
- March 29 – Sultan Yahya Petra of Kelantan, the 6th Yang di-Pertuan Agong (Head of State) of Malaysia, dies in office. He is replaced by Sultan Ahmad Shah of Pahang.
- March 30 – Airey Neave, Conservative M.P. in the British House of Commons, is killed, presumably by an Irish National Liberation Army bomb in the car park for the Houses of Parliament.
- March 31
  - The last British soldier (belonging to the Royal Navy) leaves the Maltese Islands, after 179 years of presence. Malta declares its Freedom Day (Jum il-Helsien).
  - Milk and Honey win the Eurovision Song Contest 1979 for Israel, with the song Hallelujah.

=== April ===
- April 1
  - Iran's government becomes an Islamic Republic by a 98% vote, overthrowing the Shah officially.
  - Nickelodeon launches from QUBE's Pinwheel experiment and begins airing on various Warner Cable systems beginning in Buffalo, New York, expanding its audience reach.
  - Dale Earnhardt Sr. wins his first career NASCAR race at the 1979 Southeastern 500 at Bristol Motor Speedway. He would go on to win 76 races and seven championships during his career.
- April 1–18 – Police lock Andreas Mihavecz in a holding cell in Bregenz, Austria and forget about him, leaving him there without food or drink.
- April 2 – Sverdlovsk anthrax leak: A Soviet biowarfare laboratory at Sverdlovsk accidentally releases airborne anthrax spores, killing 66 plus an unknown amount of livestock. It is a violation of the Biological Weapons Convention of 1972.
- April 2 – In Japan, the channel of TV Asahi premieres Doraemon.
- April 4 – Pakistani Prime Minister Zulfiqar Ali Bhutto is executed by hanging for the murder of a political opponent.
- April 6 – Student protests break out in Nepal.
- April 7 – In Japan, Yoshiyuki Tomino directs Mobile Suit Gundam, the first series of the metaseries of the same name.
- April 10 – A tornado hits Wichita Falls, Texas, killing 42 people (the most notable of 26 tornadoes that day).
- April 11 – Uganda–Tanzania War: Fall of Kampala: Tanzanian troops take Kampala, the capital of Uganda; Idi Amin flees.
- April 13 – The La Soufrière volcano erupts in St. Vincent and the Grenadines.
- April 14 – The Progressive Alliance of Liberia stages a protest, without a permit, against an increase in rice prices proposed by the government, with clashes between protestors and the police resulting over 70 deaths and over 500 injured.
- April 15 – 1979 Montenegro earthquake: A 6.9 M_{w} shock affects Montenegro (then part of Yugoslavia) and parts of Albania, causing extensive damage to coastal areas and taking 136 lives; the old town of Budva is devastated.
- April 17 – Schoolchildren in the Central African Republic are arrested (and around 100 killed) for protesting against compulsory school uniforms. An African judicial commission later determines that Emperor Jean-Bédel Bokassa "almost certainly" took part in the massacre.
- April 22 – The Albert Einstein Memorial is unveiled at the National Academy of Sciences in Washington, D.C.
- April 23 – Fighting breaks out in London between the Anti-Nazi League and the Metropolitan Police's Special Patrol Group; protester Blair Peach receives fatal injuries during the incident, now officially attributed to the SPG.

=== May ===
- May 1 – Greenland is granted limited autonomy from Denmark, with its own Parliament sitting in Nuuk.
- May 3 – The 1979 United Kingdom general election for the House of Commons takes place, giving the Conservatives a majority, and designating Margaret Thatcher the nation's first woman prime minister, ending the rule of James Callaghan's Labour government.
- May 8 – Ten shoppers die in a fire at the Woolworths department store in Manchester city centre in the UK.
- May 9
  - The Salvadoran Civil War begins.
  - The Unabomber bomb injures Northwestern University graduate student John Harris.
- May 10 – The Federated States of Micronesia becomes self-governing.
- May 15 – Uganda–Tanzania War: Battle of Lira: Tanzania and its Uganda National Liberation Front allies capture Lira, Uganda, from the forces of Ugandan dictator Idi Amin.
- May 21
  - Dan White is convicted of manslaughter, rather than murder, for the assassination of San Francisco Mayor George Moscone and Supervisor Harvey Milk, after using what would become known as the "Twinkie defense" and persuading a jury that the crime was not premeditated. The maximum sentence is seven years imprisonment, with eligibility for early parole, prompting the "White Night riots" in the gay community.
  - The Montreal Canadiens defeat the New York Rangers four games to one to win their fourth consecutive Stanley Cup.
- May 24
  - Thorpe Park: Opens its doors having attractions such as Phantom Fantasia also next door had a farm called Thorpe Farm
- May 25
  - American Airlines Flight 191: In Chicago, a DC-10 crashes during takeoff at O'Hare International Airport, killing all 271 on board and 2 people on the ground in the deadliest aviation accident in U.S. history.
  - John Spenkelink is executed in Florida, in the first use of the electric chair in America after the reintroduction of the death penalty in 1976.
  - Etan Patz, six years old, is kidnapped in New York. He is often referred to as the "Boy on the Milk Carton" and the investigation later sprouts into one of the most famous child abduction cases of all time. This is a cold case until 2010 when it is re-opened. In April 2017, Pedro Hernandez is convicted of the murder and kidnapping and sentenced to life imprisonment.
- May 27 – Indianapolis 500: Rick Mears wins the race for the first time, and car owner Roger Penske for the second time.

=== June ===
- June 1
  - The Vizianagaram district is formed in Andhra Pradesh, India.
  - The first black-led government of Rhodesia in 90 years takes power, in succession to Ian Smith and under his power-sharing deal, in the unrecognized republic of Zimbabwe Rhodesia.
  - The Seattle SuperSonics win the NBA Championship against the Washington Bullets.
- June 2
  - Pope John Paul II arrives in his native Poland on his first official, nine-day stay, becoming the first Pope to visit a Communist country. This visit, known as nine days that changed the world, brings about the solidarity of the Polish people against Communism, ultimately leading to the rise of the Solidarity movement.
  - Los Angeles' city council passes the city's first homosexual rights bill signed without fanfare by mayor Tom Bradley.
- June 3
  - Ixtoc I oil spill: A blowout at the Ixtoc I oil well in the southern Gulf of Mexico causes at least 600,000 tons (176,400,000 gallons) of oil to be spilled into the waters, the worst oil spill to date. Some estimate the spill to be 428 million gallons, making it the largest unintentional oil spill until it is surpassed by the Deepwater Horizon oil spill in 2010.
  - 1979 Italian general election: The Italian Communist Party loses a significant number of seats.
- June 4
  - Joe Clark becomes Canada's 16th and youngest Prime Minister.
  - Flight Lieutenant Jerry Rawlings takes power in Ghana after a military coup in which General Fred Akuffo is overthrown.
  - Following the "Muldergate" Information Scandal, John Vorster resigns as State President of South Africa.
- June 7 – 1979 European Parliament election: The first direct elections to the European Parliament begin, allowing citizens from across all nine (at this time) member states of the European Communities to elect 410 MEPs. It is also the first international election in history.
- June 9–23 – The 1979 Cricket World Cup is held in England with West Indies defeating England in the final.
- June 12 – Bryan Allen flies the man-powered Gossamer Albatross across the English Channel.
- June 13 – The 1979 NHL Expansion Draft takes place, restocking the franchises from Edmonton, Hartford, Quebec, and Winnipeg, which are being admitted from the WHA as expansion teams.
- June 15
  - McDonald's introduces the Happy Meal in the United States in a nationwide advertising campaign after testing the product since February in franchises in the U.S. state of Missouri.
  - The ecological horror-thriller Prophecy is released in the United States by Paramount Pictures.
- June 18 – Jimmy Carter and Leonid Brezhnev sign the SALT II agreement in Vienna.
- June 19 – Marais Viljoen becomes State President of South Africa.
- June 20 – A Nicaraguan National Guard soldier kills ABC TV news correspondent Bill Stewart and his interpreter Juan Espinosa. Other members of the news crew capture the killing on tape.
- June 22
  - Former Liberal Party leader Jeremy Thorpe was acquitted of conspiracy to murder Norman Scott, who had accused Thorpe of having a relationship with him.
  - The WHA formally ceases operations, completing the merger with the NHL.
- June 23 – New South Wales Premier Neville Wran officially opens the Eastern Suburbs Railway in Sydney. It operates as a shuttle between Central and Bondi Junction until full integration with the Illawarra Line in 1980.
- June 24 – The Permanent Peoples' Tribunal, an international opinion tribunal, is founded in Bologna at the initiative of Senator Lelio Basso.
- June 25 – NATO Supreme Allied Commander Alexander Haig escapes an assassination attempt in Belgium by the Baader-Meinhof terrorist organization.

=== July ===
12 July: Kiribati becomes independent

- July 1
  - Sweden becomes the first country to outlaw corporal punishment in the home.
  - The Sony Walkman goes on sale for the first time in Japan.
- July 3 – U.S. President Jimmy Carter signs the first directive for secret aid to the opponents of the pro-Soviet regime in Afghanistan.
- July 4 – Psychiatrist and leader of the global anti-asylum movement Franco Basaglia visits the Colônia de Barbacena Psychiatric Hospital in Minas Gerais, Brazil, and compares the facility to Nazi concentration camps, a move that momentum to psychiatric reform in the country that same year.
- July 5 – Queen Elizabeth II attends the millennium celebrations of the Isle of Man's Parliament, Tynwald.
- July 8 – Los Angeles passes its gay and lesbian civil rights bill.
- July 9 – A car bomb destroys a Renault owned by Nazi hunters Serge and Beate Klarsfeld at their home in France. A note purportedly from ODESSA claims responsibility.
- July 11 – NASA's first orbiting space station, Skylab, begins falling back Earth as its orbit decays after more than six years.
- July 12
  - The Gilbert Islands become fully independent of the United Kingdom as Kiribati.
  - A Disco Demolition Night publicity stunt goes awry at Comiskey Park, forcing the Chicago White Sox to forfeit their game against the Detroit Tigers.
  - Carmine Galante, boss of the Bonanno crime family, is assassinated in Brooklyn.
  - A fire at a hotel in Zaragoza, Spain, leaves 72 dead, the worst hotel fire in Europe in decades.
- July 15 – President Jimmy Carter addresses the nation in a televised speech talking about the "crisis of confidence in America today"; it would go on to be known as his "national malaise" speech.
- July 16 – Iraqi President Hasan al-Bakr resigns and Vice President Saddam al-Tikriti, more commonly referred to in the Western press as "Saddam Hussein", assumes the presidency.
- July 17 – Nicaraguan president General Anastasio Somoza Debayle resigns and flees to Miami.
- July 18 – Over 500 people die after a tsunami occurs on Lembata Island, triggered by a landslide on the Iliwerung volcano.
- July 21
  - Nicaraguan Revolution: The Sandinista National Liberation Front concludes a successful revolutionary campaign against the Somoza dynasty and assumes power in Nicaragua.
  - Maria de Lourdes Pintasilgo becomes prime minister of Portugal.
  - Maritza Sayalero of Venezuela wins the Miss Universe pageant; the stage collapses after contestants and news photographers rush to her throne.
  - The disco music genre dominates and peaks on the Billboard Hot 100 chart, with the first six spots (beginning with Donna Summer's Bad Girls), and seven of the chart's top ten songs ending that week.
- July 22 – 1979 Ba'ath Party Purge: Iraqi president Saddam Hussein arranges the arrest and later execution of nearly seventy members of his ruling Ba'ath Party.
- July 28 – Morarji Desai resigns as India's prime minister and Charan Singh succeeds him.

=== August ===
- August 3 – Dictator Francisco Macías Nguema of Equatorial Guinea is overthrown in a bloody coup d'état led by Teodoro Obiang Nguema Mbasogo.
- August 4 – Opening game of the American Football Bundesliga played between Frankfurter Löwen and Düsseldorf Panther, first-ever league game of American football in Germany.
- August 5 – The Polisario Front signs a peace treaty with Mauritania. Mauritania withdraws from the Western Sahara territory it had occupied, and cedes it to the SADR.
- August 6 – Bauhaus releases their debut single "Bela Lugosi's Dead", considered to be the first gothic rock release.
- August 8 – Two American commercial divers, Richard Walker and Victor Guiel, die of hypothermia after their diving bell becomes stranded at a depth of over 160 metres (520 ft) in the East Shetland Basin. The legal repercussions of the accident will lead to important safety changes in the diving industry.
- August 9
  - Raymond Washington, co-founder of the Crips, one of the largest, most notorious gangs in the United States, is killed in a drive-by shooting in Los Angeles.
  - Female workers of YH Trading in South Korea held a sit-in protest in response to the company's unilateral shutdown.
- August 10 – Michael Jackson releases his breakthrough album Off the Wall. It sells 7 million copies in the United States alone, making it a 7× platinum album.
- August 11
  - The former Mauritanian province of Tiris al-Gharbiyya in Western Sahara is annexed by Morocco.
  - The Machchu-2 dam in Morbi, India, collapses, killing between 1800 and 25000 people in one of the worst ever dam failures.
- August 14 – A freak storm during the Fastnet Race results in the deaths of 15 sailors.
- August 17 – The controversial religious satirical film Monty Python's Life of Brian premieres in the United States.
- August 27 – The Troubles: Lord Mountbatten of Burma and two others are killed in a bombing on his boat in the Republic of Ireland by the Provisional Irish Republican Army (IRA). Mountbatten was a British fleet admiral, statesman and an uncle of The Duke of Edinburgh. On the same day, the Warrenpoint ambush occurs, killing 18 British soldiers. Doreen Knatchbull, Baroness Brabourne would die in a hospital the following day from injuries sustained in the bombing.
- August 29 – A national referendum is held in which Somali voters approve a new liberal constitution, promulgated by President Siad Barre to placate the United States.

=== September ===
- September 1
  - The U.S. Pioneer 11 becomes the first spacecraft to visit Saturn when it passes the planet at a distance of 21,000 kilometres (13,000 mi).
  - Sri Lanka Army Women's Corps is formed.
- September 7 – The first cable sports channel, the Entertainment Sports Programming Network (better known as ESPN), is launched in the United States.
- September 9 – The long-running comic strip For Better or For Worse begins its run, in Canada, before becoming syndicated elsewhere in North America and the world.
- September 12 – Hurricane Frederic makes landfall at 10:00 p.m. on Alabama's Gulf Coast.
- September 13 – South Africa grants independence to the "homeland" of Venda (not recognised outside South Africa).
- September 16
  - East German balloon escape: Two families flee from East Germany by balloon.
  - The Sugarhill Gang release Rapper's Delight in the United States, the first rap single to become a Top 40 hit on the Billboard Hot 100.
- September 20 – French paratroopers help David Dacko to overthrow Emperor Bokassa in the Central African Empire.
- September 22 – Vela incident: The "South Atlantic Flash" is observed near the Prince Edward Islands in the Indian Ocean, thought to be a nuclear weapons test conducted by South Africa and Israel.
- September 29 – The overthrown dictator Francisco Macías Nguema of Equatorial Guinea is convicted of genocide and executed by firing squad.
- September 30 – The MTR in Hong Kong begins service with the opening of its Modified Initial System, the Kwun Tong Line.

=== October ===
27 October: Saint Vincent and the Grenadines becomes independent

- October 1 – Nigeria terminates military rule, and the Second Nigerian Republic is established.
- October 1–7 – Pope John Paul II makes a six-city visit to the United States, starting in Boston.
- October 1 – The MTR, the rapid transit railway system in Hong Kong, opens.
- October 2 – Pope John Paul II arrives in New York City for his first papal tour where he addresses the U.N. General Assembly against all forms of concentration camps and torture.
- October 6 – Federal Reserve System changes from an interest rate target policy to a money supply target policy.
- October 7 – Pope John Paul II ends his first U.S. papal visit in Washington, D.C., with his first-ever visit to the White House.
- October 9 – Peter Brock wins the Bathurst 1000 by a record six laps, with a lap record on the last lap.
- October 12
  - Near Guam, Typhoon Tip reaches a record intensity of 870 millibars, the lowest pressure recorded at sea level. This makes Tip the most powerful tropical cyclone in known world history.
  - Thorbjörn Fälldin returns as Prime Minister of Sweden, replacing Ola Ullsten who is named Foreign Minister of Sweden.
  - The Hitchhiker's Guide to the Galaxy, the first novel by Douglas Adams, is published in the United Kingdom
- October 14 – National March for gay rights takes place in Washington, D.C., involving tens of thousands of people.
- October 15 – Black Monday events, in which members of a political group sack a newspaper office, unfold in Malta.
- October 16 – A tsunami in Nice, France, kills 23 people.
- October 17 – The Pittsburgh Pirates become only the fourth MLB team (as well as the only MLB franchise to accomplish the feat twice) to recover from a 3-games-to-1 deficit to win the 1979 World Series.
- October 19 – 13 U.S. Marines die in a fire at Camp Fuji, Japan, as a result of Typhoon Tip.
- October 20 – The first McDonald's in Singapore opens at Liat Towers in Orchard Road.
- October 26 –
  - Park Chung Hee, the President of South Korea, is assassinated by KCIA director Kim Jae-gyu.
  - The eradication of the smallpox virus is announced by the World Health Organization, making smallpox the first of only two human diseases that have been driven to extinction (rinderpest in 2011 being the other).
- October 27 – Saint Vincent and the Grenadines gains independence from the UK.
- October 31 – Western Airlines Flight 2605 crashes upon landing at Mexico City International Airport, killing 72 occupants plus one on the ground; 16 people on board survive.

=== November ===
- November 1
  - General Luis García Meza carries out a military coup in Bolivia.
  - Iran hostage crisis: Iranian Ayatollah Ruhollah Khomeini urges his people to demonstrate on November 4 and to expand attacks on United States and Israeli interests.
- November 2
  - French police shoot gangster Jacques Mesrine in Paris.
  - Assata Shakur (née Joanne Chesimard), a former member of the Black Panther Party and Black Liberation Army, escapes from a New York prison to Cuba, where she remains under political asylum until her death in 2025.
- November 3 – Greensboro massacre: In Greensboro, North Carolina, five members of the Communist Workers Party are shot to death and seven are wounded by a group of Klansmen and neo-Nazis, during a "Death to the Klan" rally.
- November 4 – Iran hostage crisis begins: 500 Iranian radicals, mostly students, invade the U.S. Embassy in Tehran and take 90 hostages (53 of whom are American). They demand that the United States send the former Shah of Iran back to stand trial.
- November 5
  - All Saints' Massacre: The military junta in Bolivia initiates a violent crack-down on its opponents.
  - The radio news program Morning Edition premieres on National Public Radio in the United States.
- November 6 – At Montevideo, Uruguay, the International Olympic Committee adopts a resolution, whereby Taiwan Olympic and sports teams will participate with the name Chinese Taipei in future Olympic Games and international sports tournaments and championships.
- November 7 – U.S. Senator Ted Kennedy announces that he will challenge President Jimmy Carter for the 1980 Democratic presidential nomination.
- November 9
  - The Carl Bridgewater murder trial ends in England with all four men found guilty. James Robinson, 45, and 25-year-old Vincent Hickey are sentenced to life imprisonment with a recommended 25-year minimum for murder. 18-year-old Michael Hickey is also found guilty of murder and sentenced to indefinite detention. Patrick Molloy, 53, is found guilty on a lesser charge of manslaughter and sentenced to 12 years in prison.
  - Nuclear false alarm: the NORAD computers and the Alternate National Military Command Center in Fort Ritchie, Maryland, detect an apparent massive Soviet nuclear strike. After reviewing the raw data from satellites and checking the early-warning radars, the alert is cancelled.
- November 10 – 1979 Mississauga train derailment: A 106-car Canadian Pacific freight train carrying explosive and poisonous chemicals from Windsor, Ontario, Canada derails in Mississauga, just west of Toronto, causing a massive explosion and the largest peacetime evacuation in Canadian history and one of the largest in North American history.
- November 12
  - Iran hostage crisis: In response to the hostage situation in Tehran, U.S. President Jimmy Carter orders a halt to all oil imports into the United States from Iran.
  - Süleyman Demirel, of the Justice Party (AP) forms the new government of Turkey (43rd government, a minority government).
- November 13 – Ronald Reagan announces his candidacy for President of the United States, 9 days after the beginning of the Iran hostage crisis.
- November 14 – Iran hostage crisis: U.S. President Jimmy Carter issues Executive Order 12170, freezing all Iranian assets in the United States and U.S. banks in response to the hostage crisis.
- November 15 – British art historian and former Surveyor of the Queen's Pictures Anthony Blunt's role as the "fourth man" of the 'Cambridge Five' double agents for the Soviet NKVD during World War II is revealed by Prime Minister Margaret Thatcher in the House of Commons of the United Kingdom; she gives further details on November 21.
- November 16 – Bucharest Metro Line One is opened, in Bucharest, Romania (from Timpuri Noi to Semanatoarea stations, 8.63 kilometres (5.36 mi)).
- November 17 – Iran hostage crisis: Iranian leader Ruhollah Khomeini orders the release of 13 female and African American hostages being held at the U.S. Embassy in Tehran.
- November 20 – Grand Mosque seizure: A group of 200 Juhayman al-Otaybi militants occupy Mecca's Masjid al-Haram, the holiest place in Islam. They are driven out by Saudi military forces after bloody fighting that leaves 250 people dead and 600 wounded.
- November 21 – After false radio reports from the Ayatollah Khomeini that the Americans had occupied the Grand Mosque in Mecca, the United States Embassy in Islamabad, Pakistan is attacked by a mob and set afire, killing four, and disturbing Pakistan–United States relations.
- November 23 – The Troubles: In Dublin, Ireland, Provisional Irish Republican Army member Thomas McMahon is sentenced to life in prison for the assassination of Lord Mountbatten of Burma in August. He was released in 1998 under the terms of the Good Friday Agreement.
- November 25 – The last cargo of phosphate was shipped from Banaba Island in Kiribati in the South Pacific Ocean, bringing an end to the island's chief industry.
- November 28 – Air New Zealand Flight 901: an Air New Zealand DC-10 crashes into Mount Erebus in Antarctica on a sightseeing trip, killing all 257 people on board.
- November 29 – After 12 years of environmental controversy and legal action, the Tennessee Valley Authority's Tellico Dam project is completed. It remains the last dam to be built by the agency as of 2023.
- November 30 – The Wall, a rock opera concept album by Pink Floyd, is first released.

=== December ===
- December 3
  - The Who concert disaster: Eleven fans are killed during a crowd crush for unreserved seats before The Who rock concert at the Riverfront Coliseum in Cincinnati.
  - The United States dollar exchange rate with the Deutsche Mark falls to 1.7079 DM, the all-time low so far; this record is not broken until November 5, 1987.
  - Ayatollah Ruhollah Khomeini becomes the first Supreme Leader of Iran.
- December 4 – The Hastie fire in Kingston upon Hull, England, leads to the deaths of 3 boys and begins the hunt for Bruce George Peter Lee, the UK's most prolific killer.
- December 5 – Jack Lynch resigns as Taoiseach of Ireland; he is succeeded by Charles Haughey.
- December 6 – The world premiere of Star Trek: The Motion Picture is held at the Smithsonian Institution in Washington, D.C.
- December 12
  - The NATO Double-Track Decision: is the decision of NATO from December 12, 1979, to offer the Warsaw Pact a mutual limitation of medium-range ballistic missiles and intermediate-range ballistic missiles combined with the threat that in case of disagreement NATO would deploy more middle-range nuclear weapons in Western Europe, following the so-called "Euromissile Crisis".
  - The 8.2 M_{w} Tumaco earthquake shakes Colombia and Ecuador with a maximum Mercalli intensity of IX (Violent), killing 300–600, and generating a large tsunami.
  - Coup d'état of December Twelfth: South Korean Army Major General Chun Doo-hwan orders the arrest of Army Chief of Staff General Jeong Seung-hwa without authorization from President Choi Kyu-hah, alleging involvement in the assassination of ex-President Park Chung Hee.
  - The unrecognised state of Zimbabwe Rhodesia returns to British control and resumes using the name Southern Rhodesia.
- December 13 – The Canadian Progressive Conservative minority government of Prime Minister Joe Clark, falls in a non-confidence motion.
- December 15 – The directorial debut of Hayao Miyazaki, The Castle of Cagliostro, is released in Japan.
- December 21 – Lancaster House Agreement: A ceasefire for Rhodesia is signed at London.
- December 23 – The highest aerial tramway in Europe, the Klein Matterhorn, opens.
- December 24
  - The Soviet Union covertly launches its invasion of Afghanistan – 3 days later, PDPA general secretary Hafizullah Amin is executed in Operation Storm-333 and Babrak Karmal replaces him, beginning the war.
  - The first European Ariane rocket is launched.
- December 26 – In Rhodesia, 96 Patriotic Front guerrillas enter the capital Salisbury to monitor a ceasefire that begins December 28.

=== Date unknown ===
- The One-child policy is introduced in China – it contributes to the country's sex-ratio imbalance. It was loosened in 2013.
- Hànyǔ Pīnyīn is widely adopted as the official romanization system for Standard Chinese, leading to changes in Western spelling of Chinese toponyms.
- VisiCalc becomes the first commercial spreadsheet program.
- The first usenet experiments are conducted by Tom Truscott and Jim Ellis of Duke University.
- Worldwide per capita oil production reaches a historic peak.
- The remains of Tsar Nicholas II and some of the Romanovs are discovered and exhumed near Sverdlovsk (now Yekaterinburg).
- NBC introduces a new version of its famous peacock, used in conjunction with the 1975-style N, for the Fall season.
- Onde Tem Bruxa Tem Fada, book is published.
- China International Trust Investment Group (CITIC) founded.

== Births ==
=== January ===
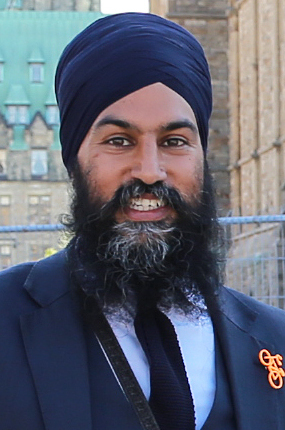
Jagmeet Singh

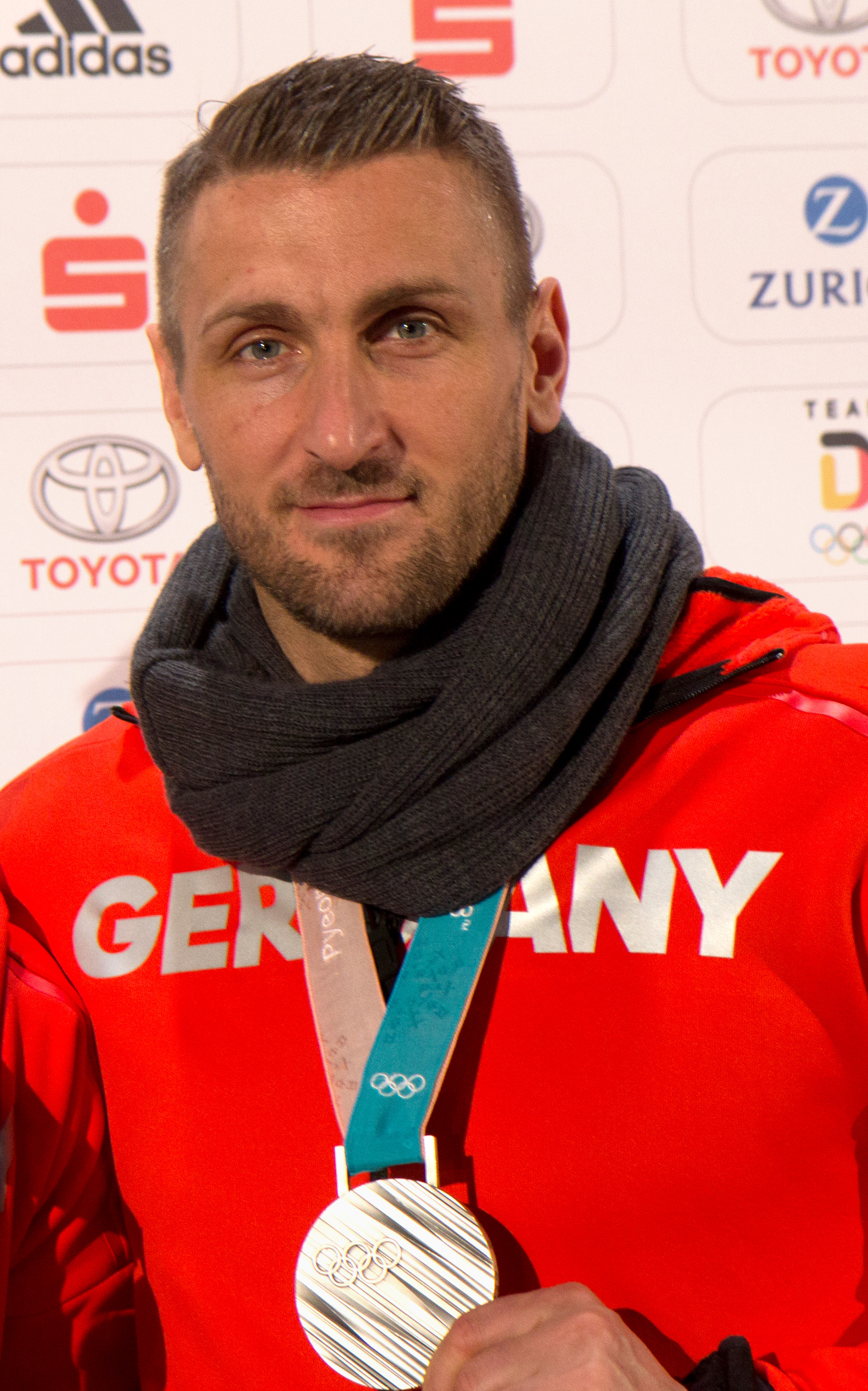
Kevin Kuske

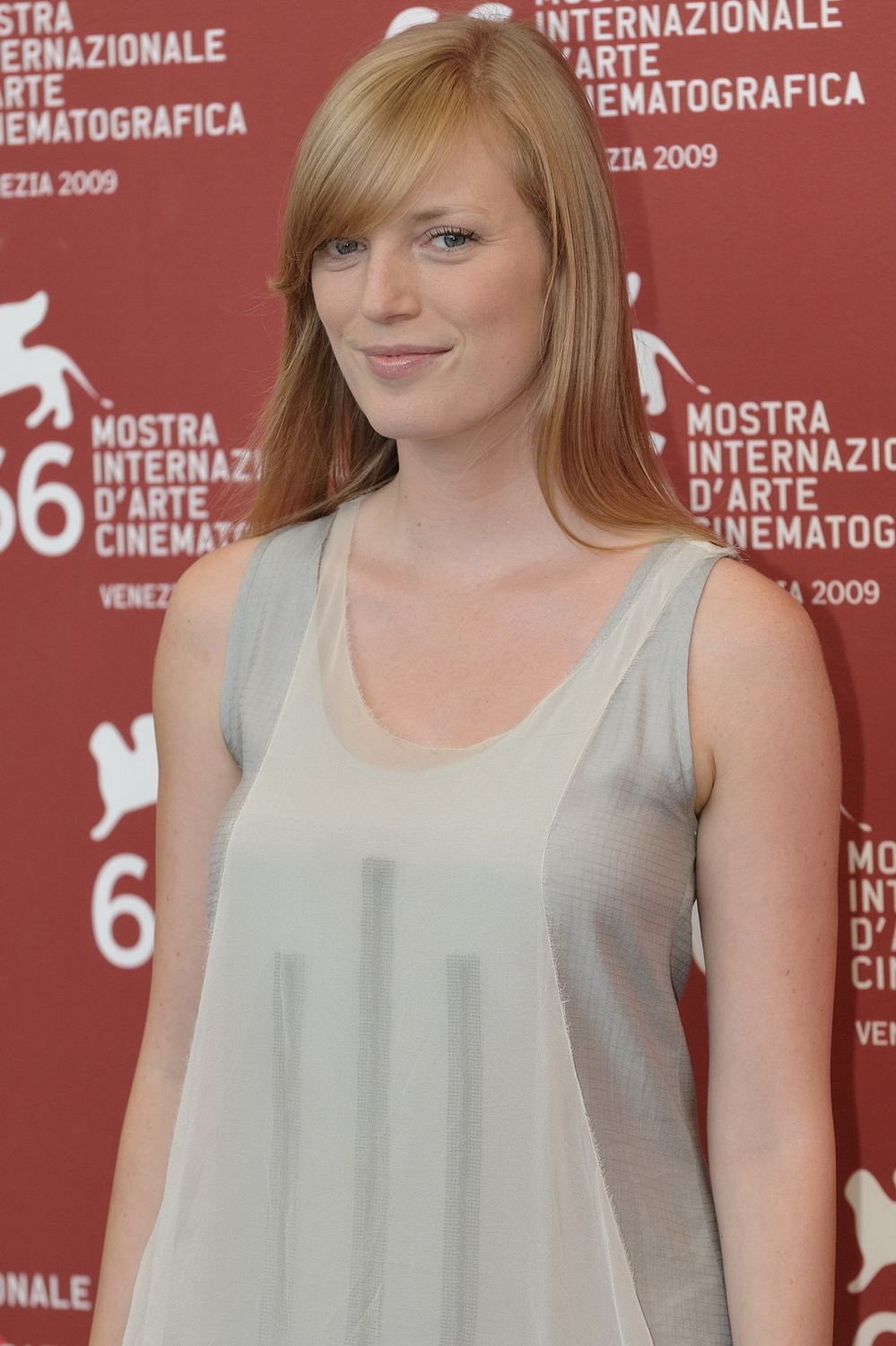
Sarah Polley

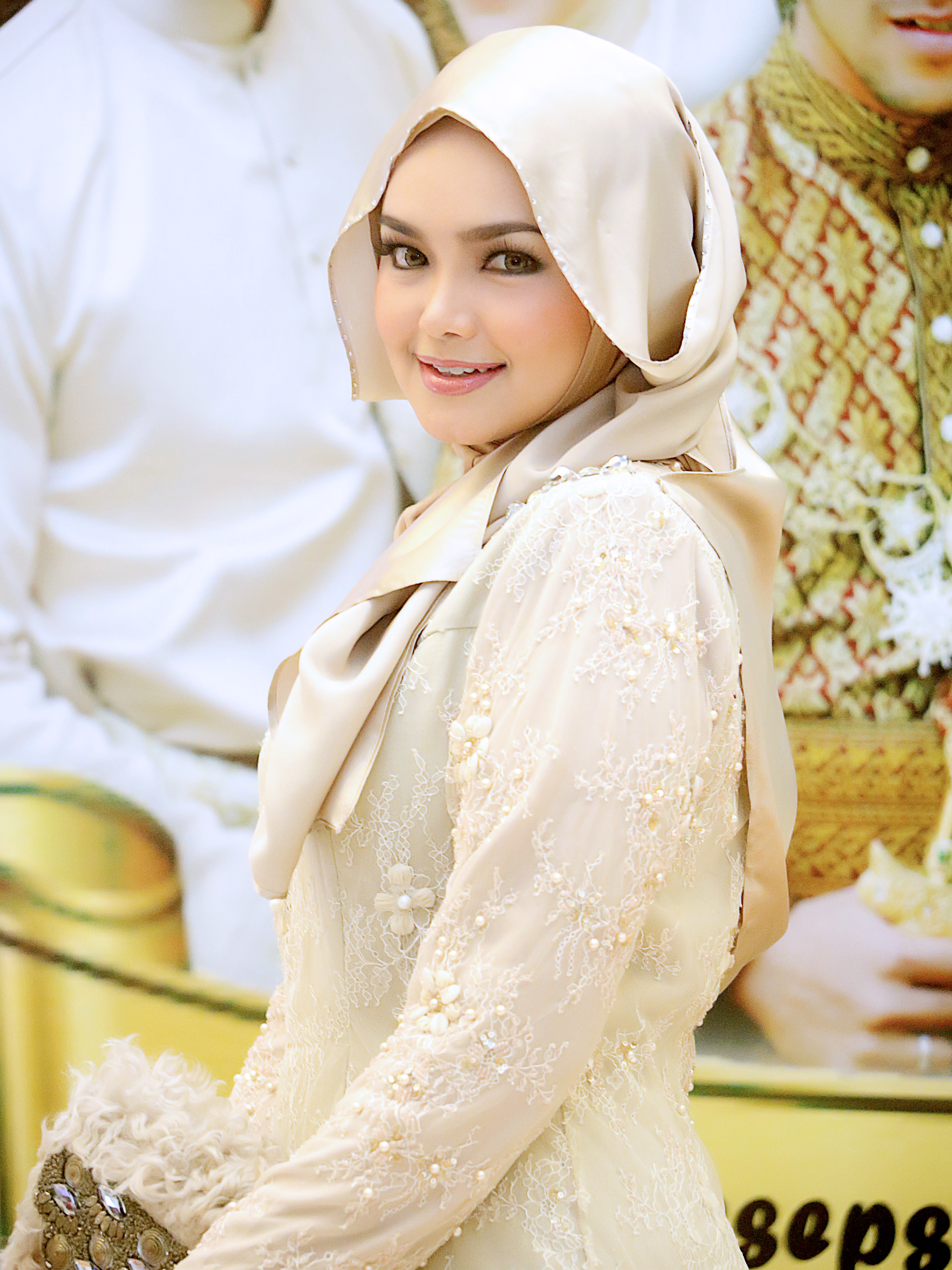
Siti Nurhaliza

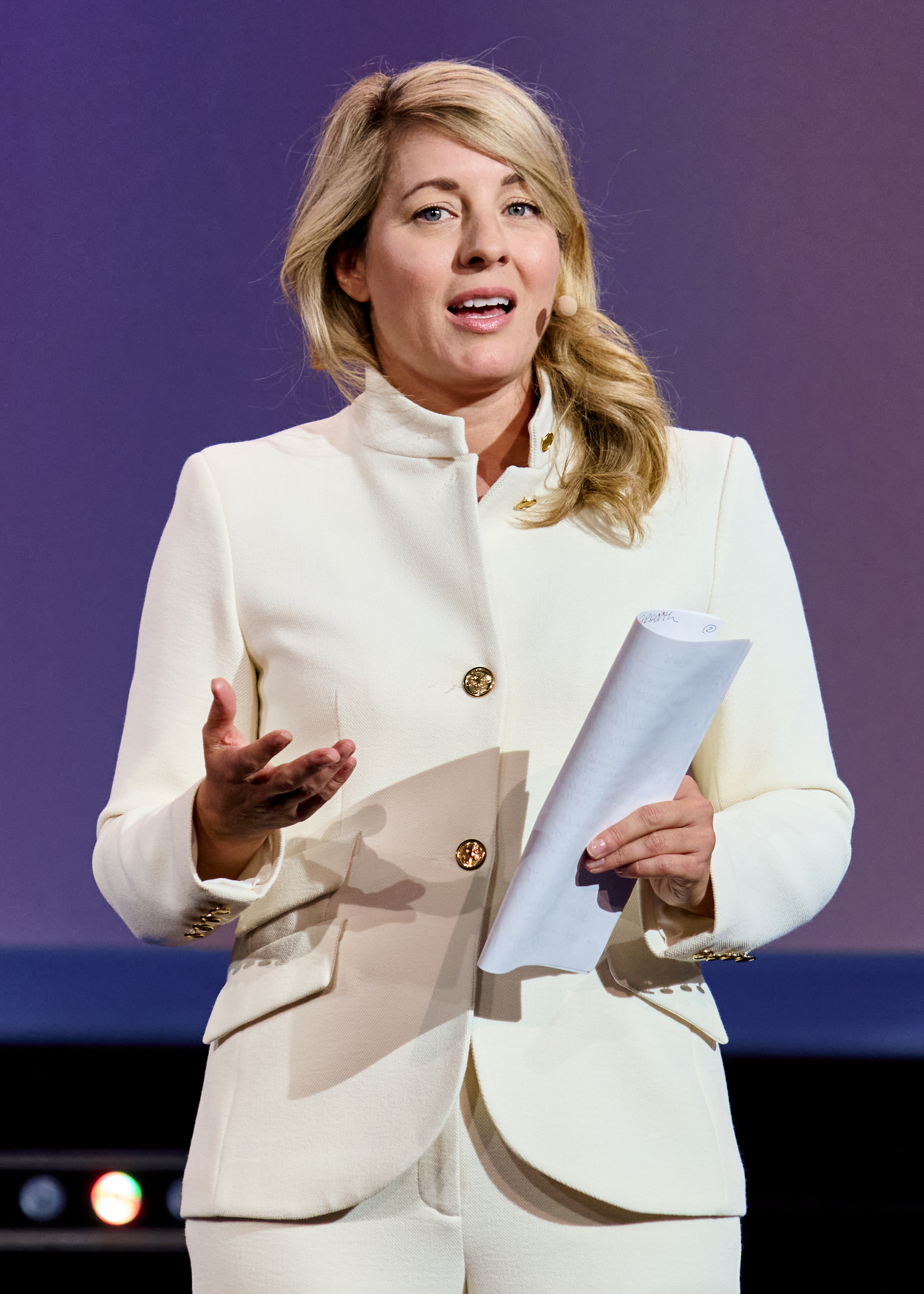
Mélanie Joly

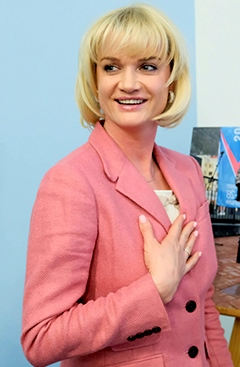
Svetlana Khorkina

- January 1
  - Brody Dalle, Australian singer
  - Vidya Balan, Indian actress
  - Gisela, Spanish pop singer and voice actress
- January 2
  - Erica Hubbard, American actress
  - Jagmeet Singh, Canadian politician, former leader of the New Democratic Party
- January 3
  - Koit Toome, Estonian singer and musical actor
  - Rie Tanaka, Japanese voice actress
- January 4
  - Olger van Dijk, Dutch politician
  - Kevin Kuske, German Olympic bobsledder
- January 5
  - Jason Basham, American stock car racing driver
  - Giuseppe Gibilisco, Italian pole vaulter
- January 6
  - Christina Chanée, Danish-Thai pop singer
  - Bernice Liu, Hong Kong actress
- January 7
  - Bipasha Basu, Indian actress and model
  - Aloe Blacc, American singer and rapper
  - Christian Lindner, German politician
- January 8
  - Seol Ki-hyeon, South Korean footballer
  - Adrian Mutu, Romanian footballer
  - Stipe Pletikosa, Croatian football goalkeeper
  - Sarah Polley, Canadian actress, writer, director, producer and political activist
- January 10 – Francesca Piccinini, Italian volleyball player
- January 11
  - Terence Morris, American basketball player
  - Siti Nurhaliza, Malaysian singer
- January 12
  - Marián Hossa, Slovak ice hockey player
  - Lee Bo-young, South Korean actress and model
  - Grzegorz Rasiak, Polish footballer
- January 13
  - María de Villota, Spanish racing driver (d. 2013)
  - Yang Wei, Chinese badminton player
- January 15
  - Drew Brees, American football player
  - Martin Petrov, Bulgarian footballer
- January 16
  - Aaliyah, American R&B singer and actress (d. 2001)
  - Mélanie Joly, Canadian politician, Minister of Industry (2025-present)
- January 17
  - Sharon Chan, Hong Kong actress
  - Masae Ueno, Japanese judoka
- January 18
  - Jay Chou, Taiwanese singer, song producer and actor
  - Paulo Ferreira, Portuguese footballer
  - Roberta Metsola, Maltese politician
  - Leo Varadkar, 14th Taoiseach of Ireland
- January 19 – Svetlana Khorkina, Russian artistic gymnast
- January 20
  - Rob Bourdon, American drummer (Linkin Park)
  - Sargis Galstyan, American actor
  - Asaka Kubo, Japanese gravure idol
  - Will Young, English singer
- January 21
  - Brian O'Driscoll, Irish rugby union player
  - Inul Daratista, Indonesian dangdut singer
  - Johann Hari, Scot-Swiss Journalist and author
- January 23 – Larry Hughes, American basketball player
- January 24
  - Tatyana Ali, American actress
  - Christine Lakin, American actress
- January 25 – Sheila Cherfilus-McCormick, American politician and businesswoman
- January 26
  - ACM Neto, Brazilian lawyer and politician
  - Sara Rue, American actress
- January 27
  - Daniel Vettori, New Zealand cricketer
- January 29 – Christina Koch, American engineer and NASA astronaut
- January 31 – Jenny Wolf, German speed skater

=== February ===
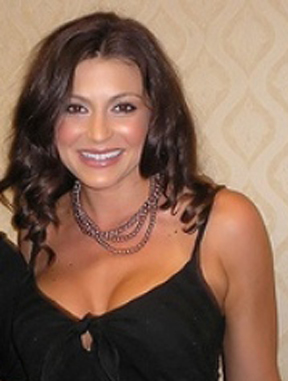
Cerina Vincent

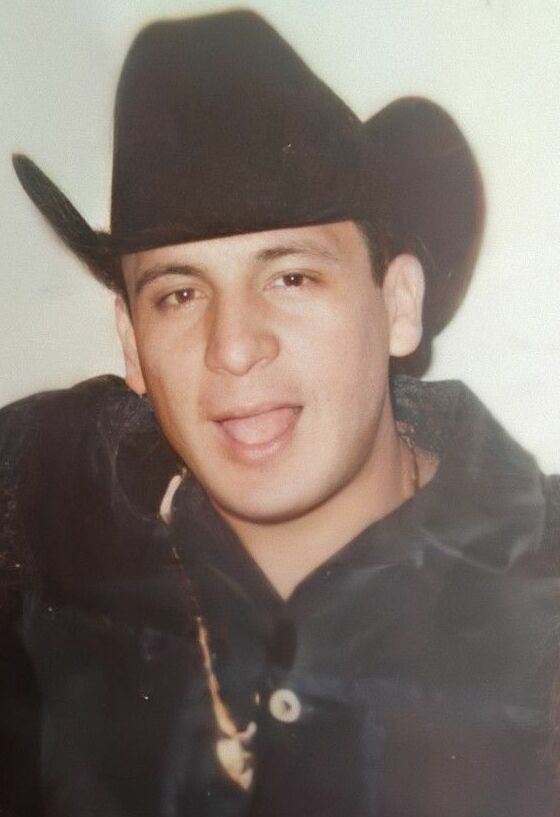
Valentín Elizalde

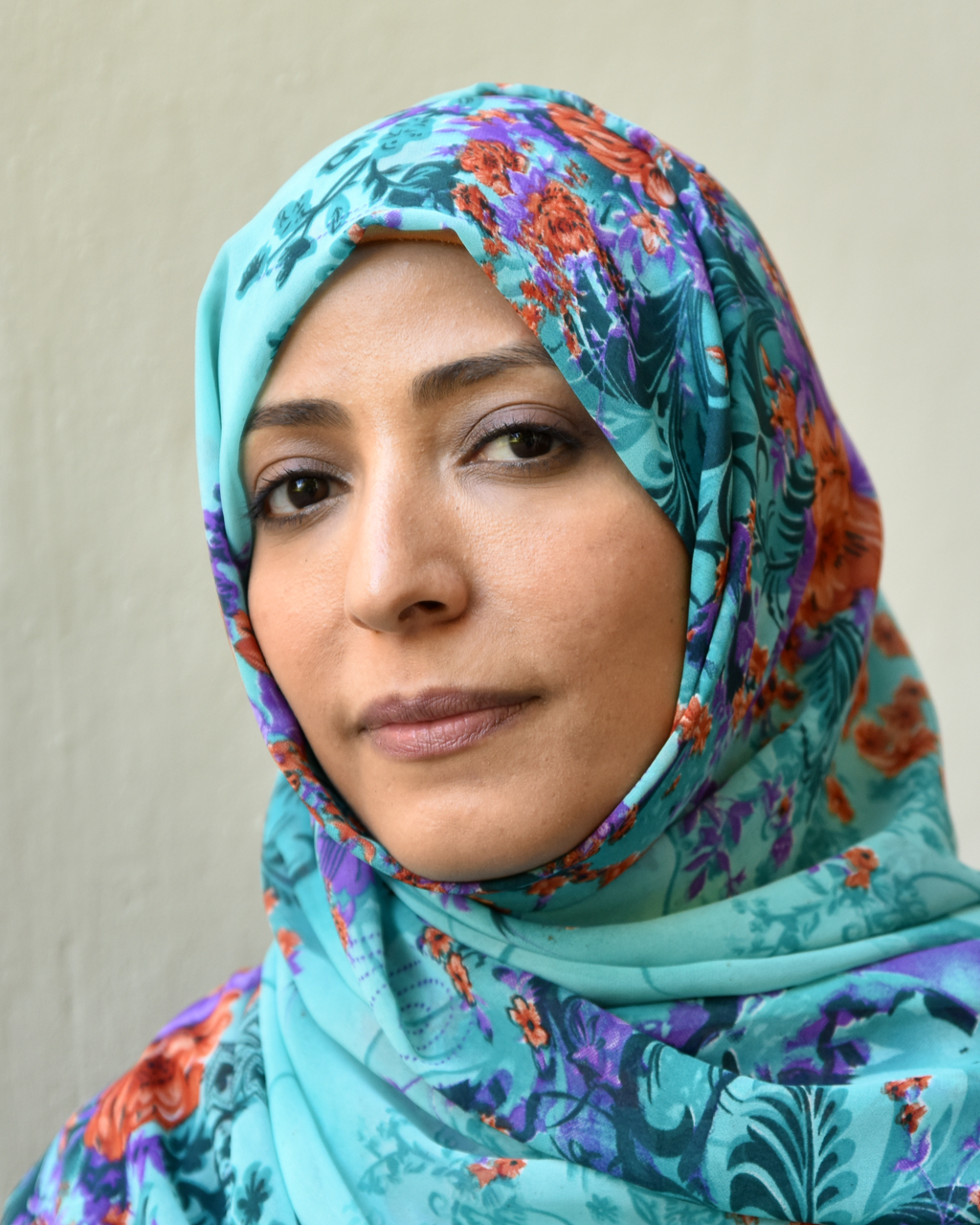
Tawakkol Karman

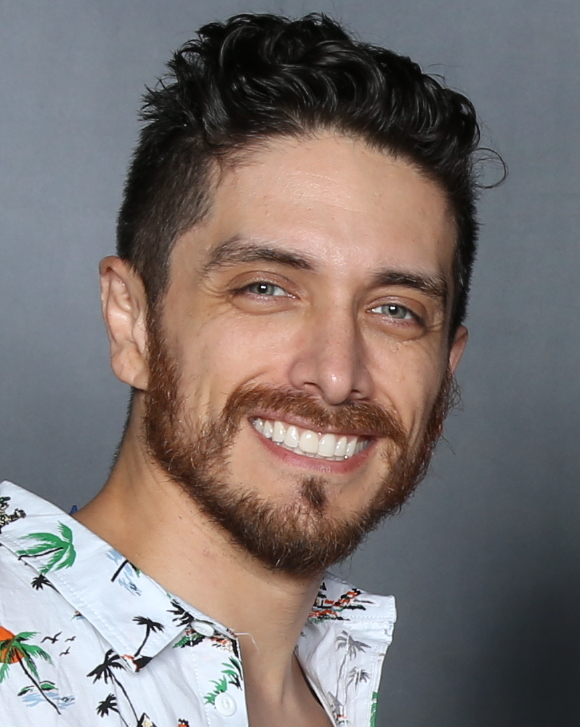
Josh Keaton

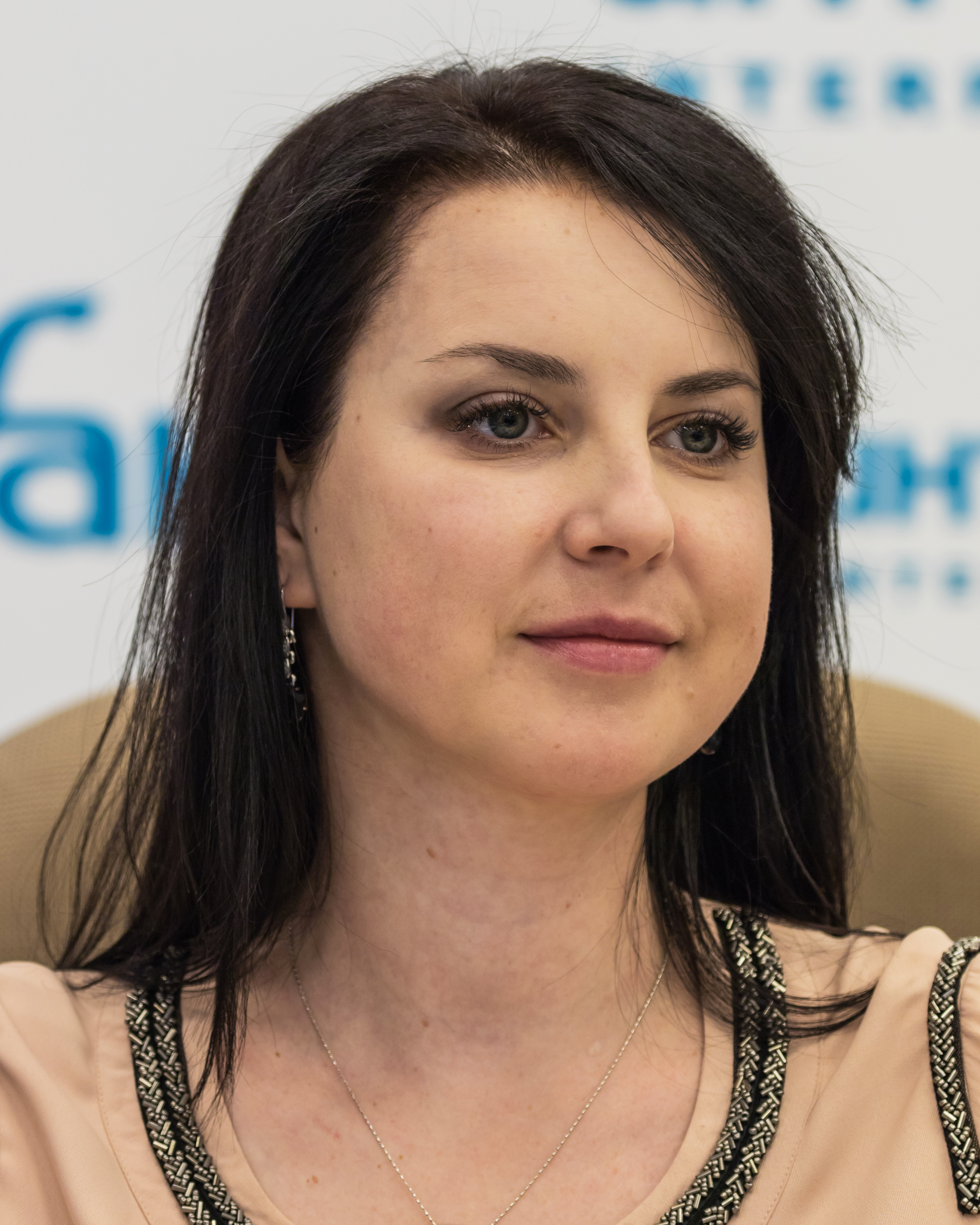
Irina Slutskaya

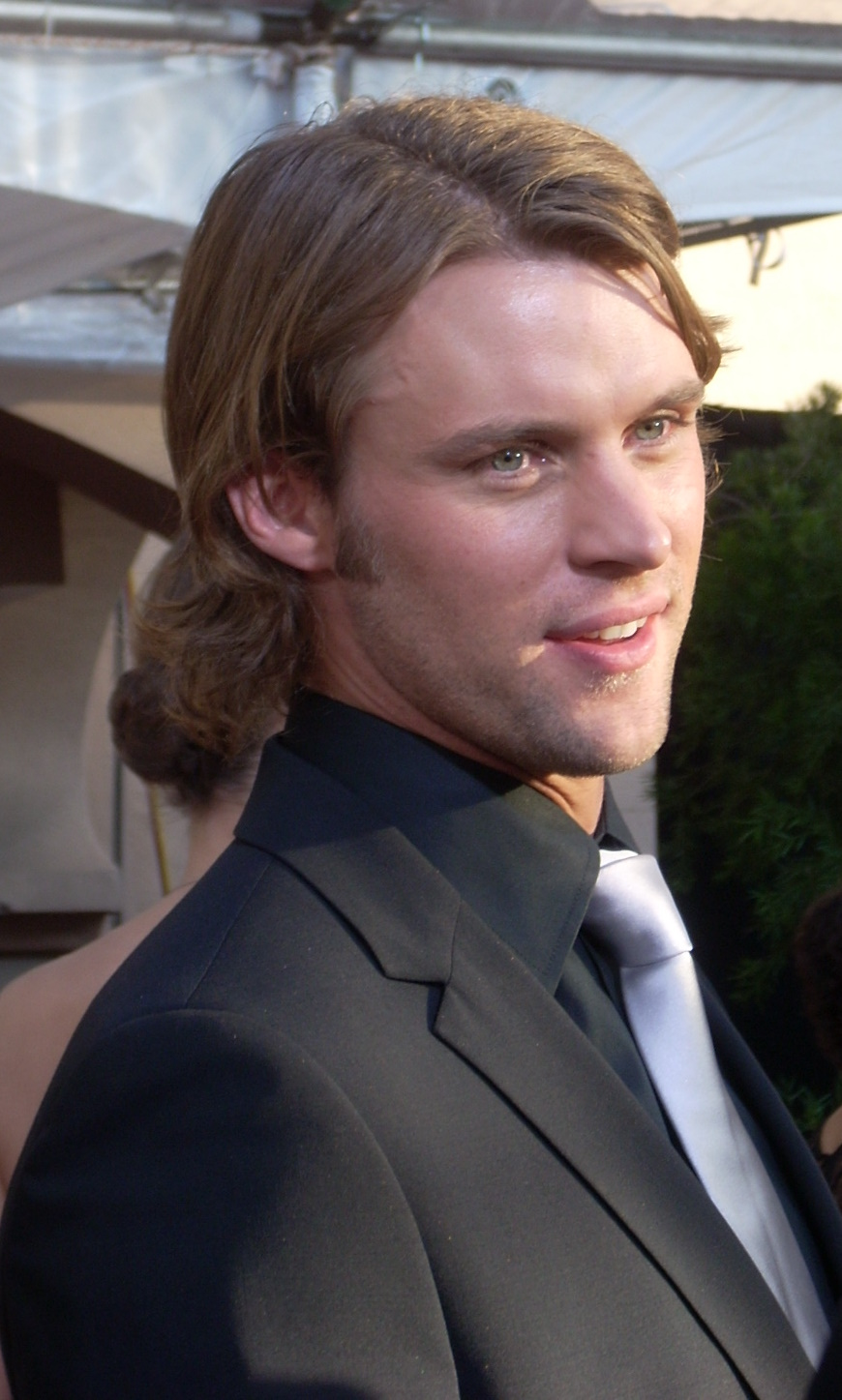
Jesse Spencer

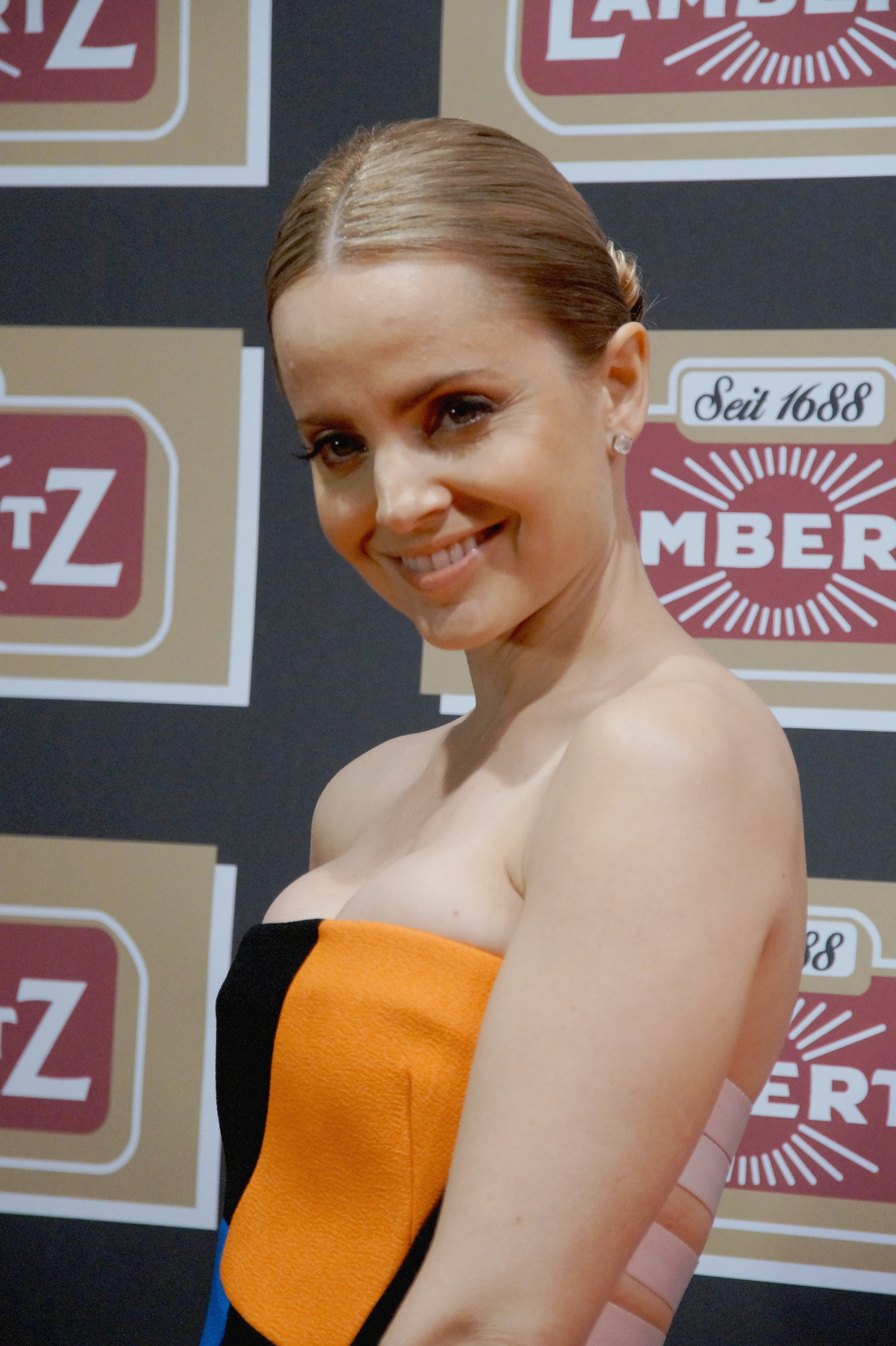
Mena Suvari

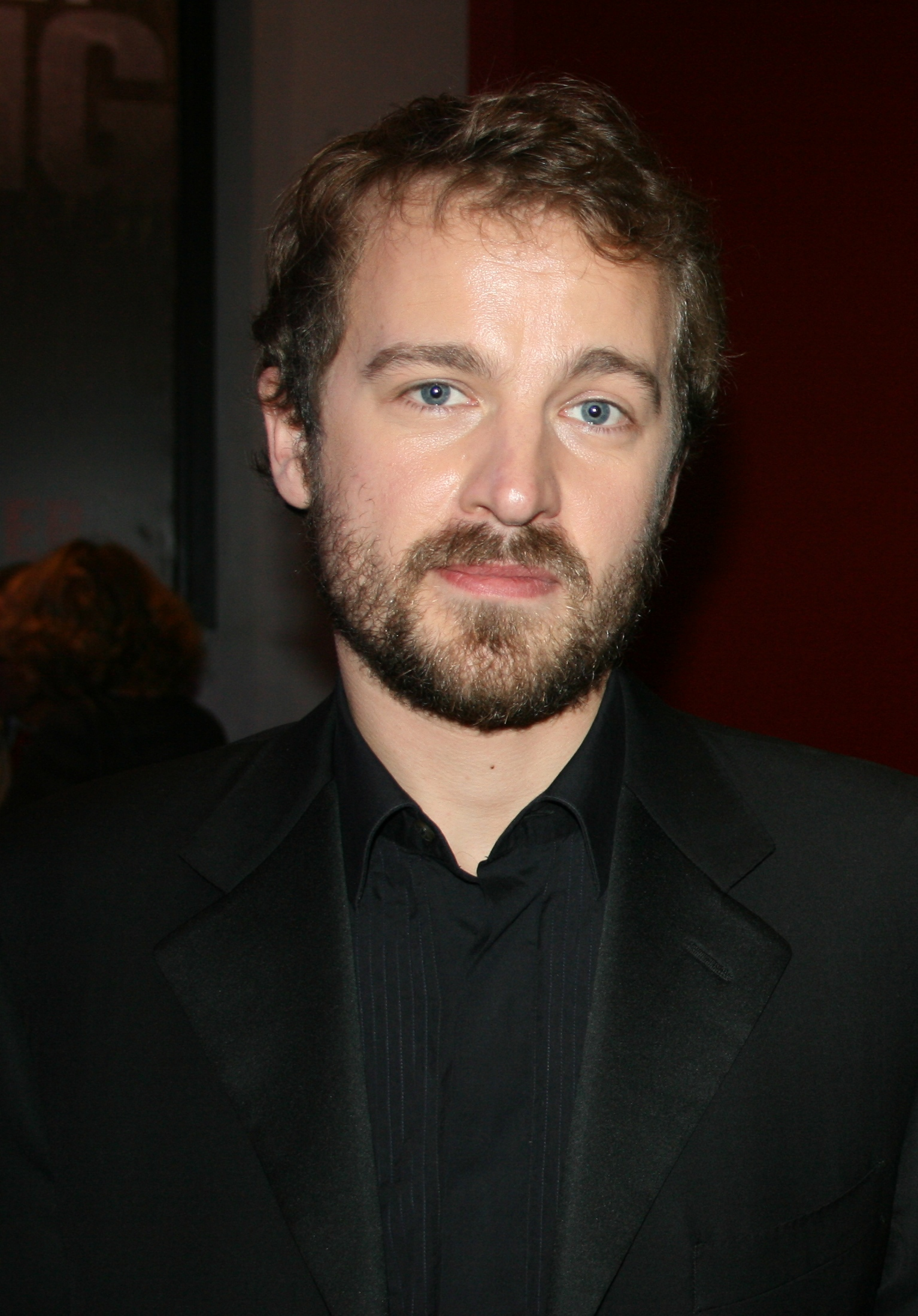
Jocelyn Quivrin

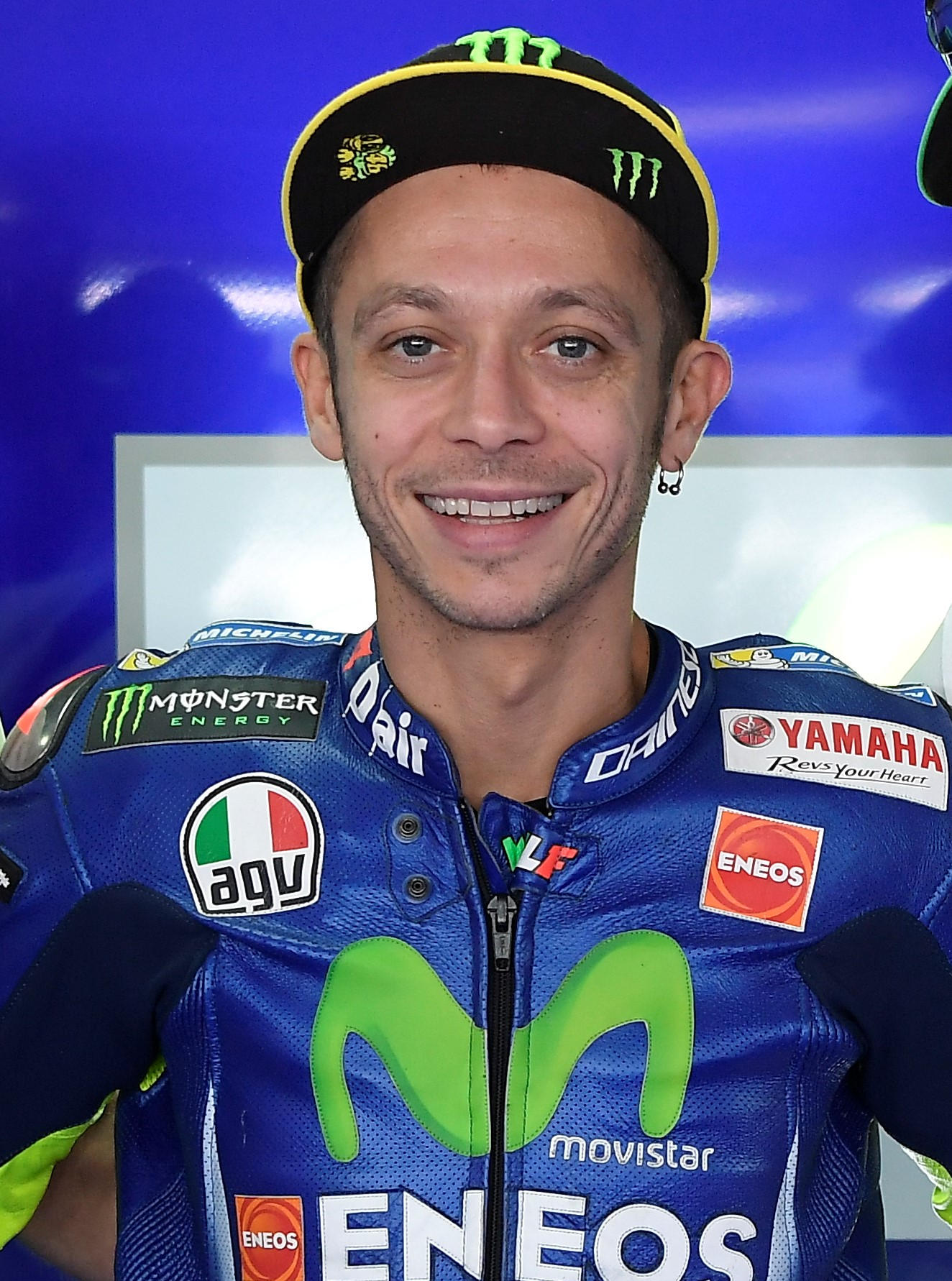
Valentino Rossi

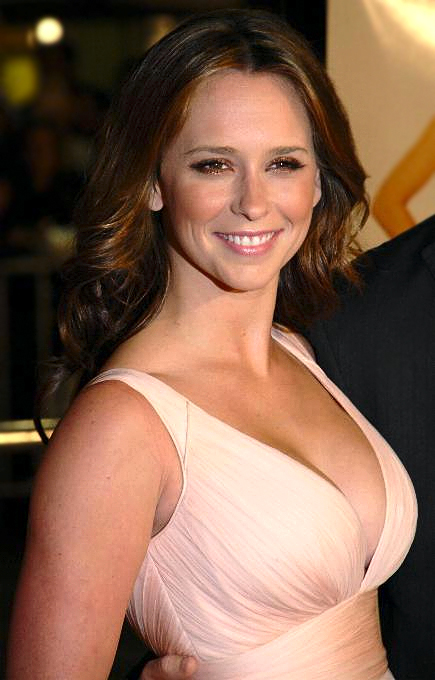
Jennifer Love Hewitt

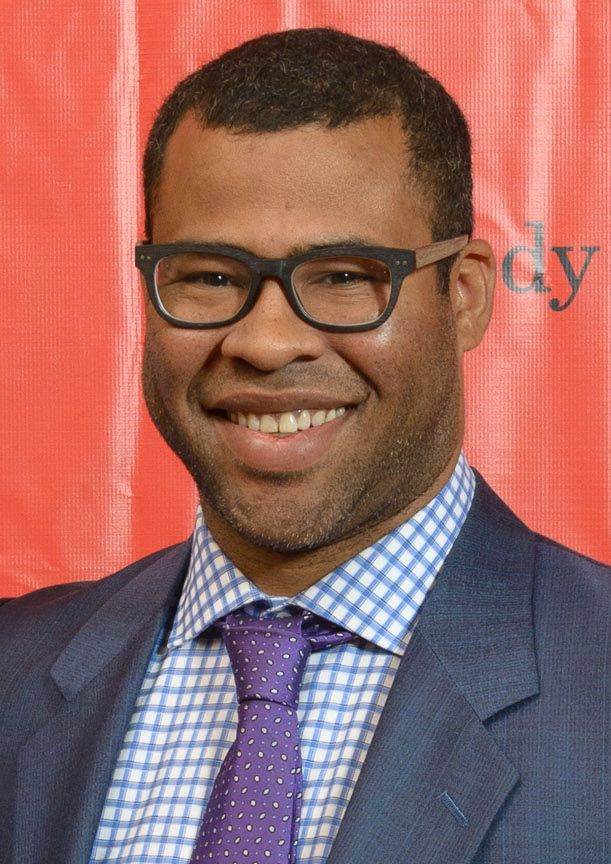
Jordan Peele

- February 1
  - Mahek Chahal, Norwegian actress and model
  - Valentín Elizalde, Mexican singer (d. 2006)
  - Peter Fulton, New Zealand cricketer
  - Juan, Brazilian football player and coach
  - Rachelle Lefevre, Canadian actress
  - Clodoaldo Silva, Brazilian paralympian swimmer
- February 2
  - Fani Chalkia, Greek athlete
  - Mayer Hawthorne, American soul singer
  - Christine Lampard, Northern Ireland television presenter
  - Shamita Shetty, Indian actress and interior designer
- February 4
  - Andrei Arlovski, Belarusian mixed martial artist
  - Jodi Shilling, American actress
  - Tabitha Brown, American actress
- February 5
  - Paulo Gonçalves, Portuguese rally racing motorcycle rider (d. 2020)
  - Ilaria Salvatori, Italian fencer
- February 7
  - Cerina Vincent, American actress and writer
  - Tawakkol Karman, Yemeni politician, Nobel Peace Prize laureate
- February 8
  - Josh Keaton, American actor
  - Aleksey Mishin, Russian wrestler
- February 9
  - Ânderson Polga, Brazilian footballer
  - Irina Slutskaya, Russian figure skater
  - Zhang Ziyi, Chinese actress and model
- February 10 – Paul Waggoner, American guitarist (Between the Buried and Me)
- February 11 – Brandy Norwood, African-American singer and actress
- February 12 – Jesse Spencer, Australian actor
- February 13
  - Anders Behring Breivik, Norwegian far-right terrorist responsible for the 2011 Norway attacks
  - Mena Suvari, American actress
  - Rafael Márquez, Mexican footballer
- February 14
  - Wesley Moodie, South African tennis player
  - Jocelyn Quivrin, French actor (d. 2009)
- February 16
  - Valentino Rossi, Italian seven-time MotoGP world champion
  - Eric Mun, leader of Korean boy-band Shinhwa
- February 17 – Cara Black, Zimbabwean tennis player
- February 19
  - Mariana Ochoa, Mexican singer and actress
  - Vitas, Ukrainian and Russian singer and actor
- February 20 – Song Chong-gug, South Korean footballer
- February 21
  - Maria Annus, Estonian actress
  - Carly Colón, Puerto Rican professional wrestler
  - Nathalie Dechy, French tennis player
  - Jennifer Love Hewitt, American actress and singer
  - Jordan Peele, American actor, comedian, writer, director, and producer
- February 25 – László Bodnár, Hungarian footballer
- February 26
  - Corinne Bailey Rae, British singer-songwriter and guitarist
  - Susana Diazayas, Mexican actress
  - Ngô Thanh Vân, Norwegian-Vietnamese actress, singer and model
- February 28
  - Michael Bisping, British mixed martial artist
  - Sébastien Bourdais, French racing driver
  - Sander van Doorn, Dutch DJ and electronic music producer
  - Ivo Karlović, Croatian tennis player

=== March ===
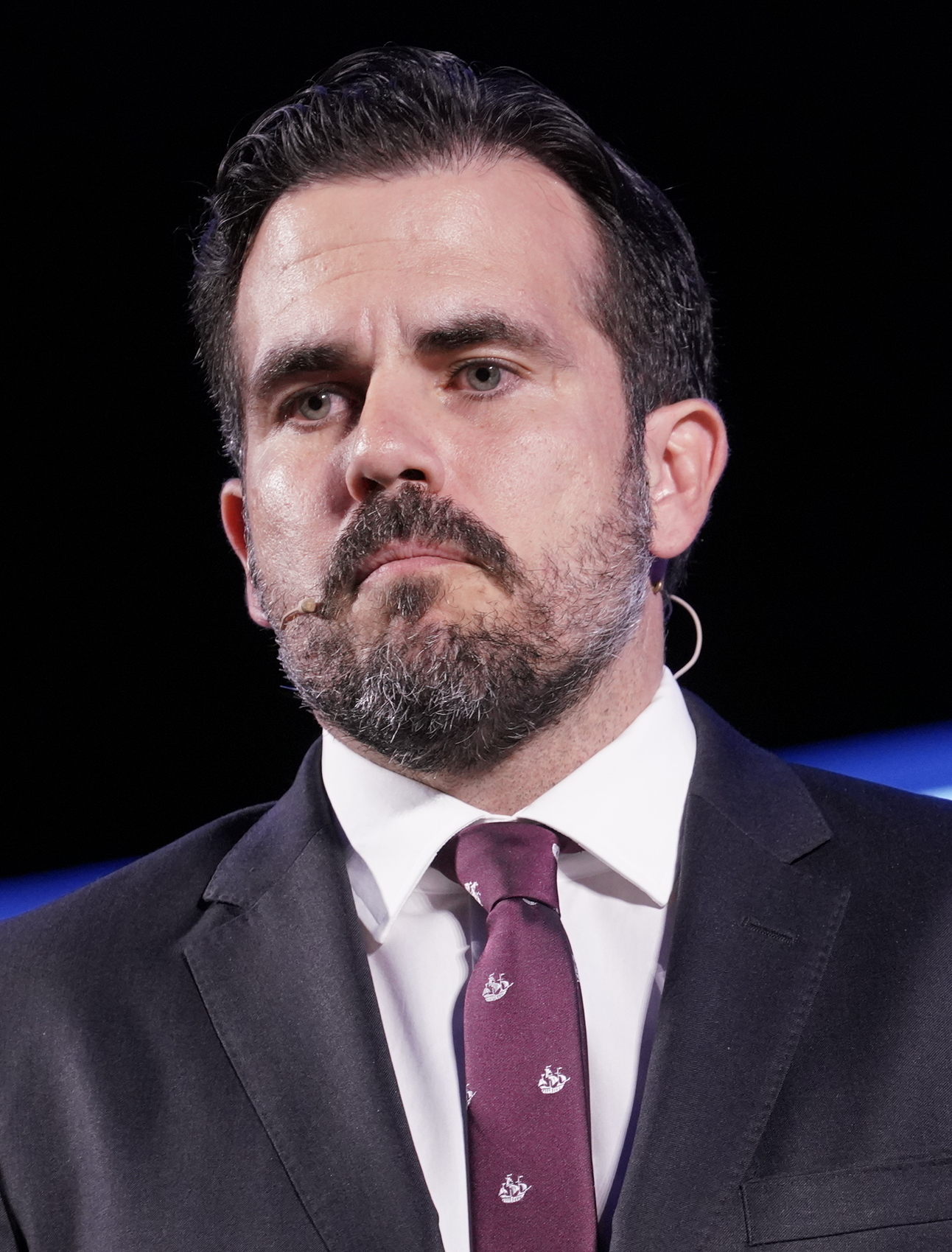
Ricardo Rosselló

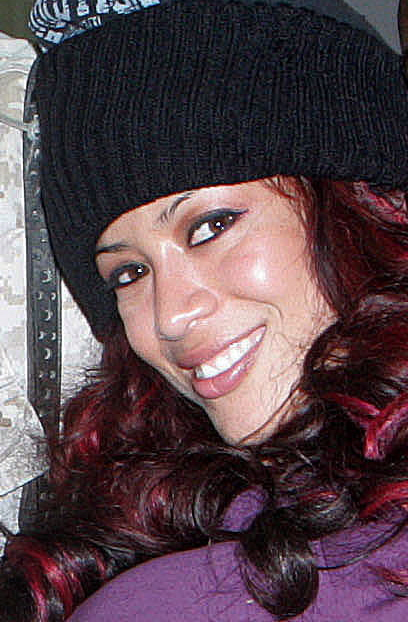
Melina Perez

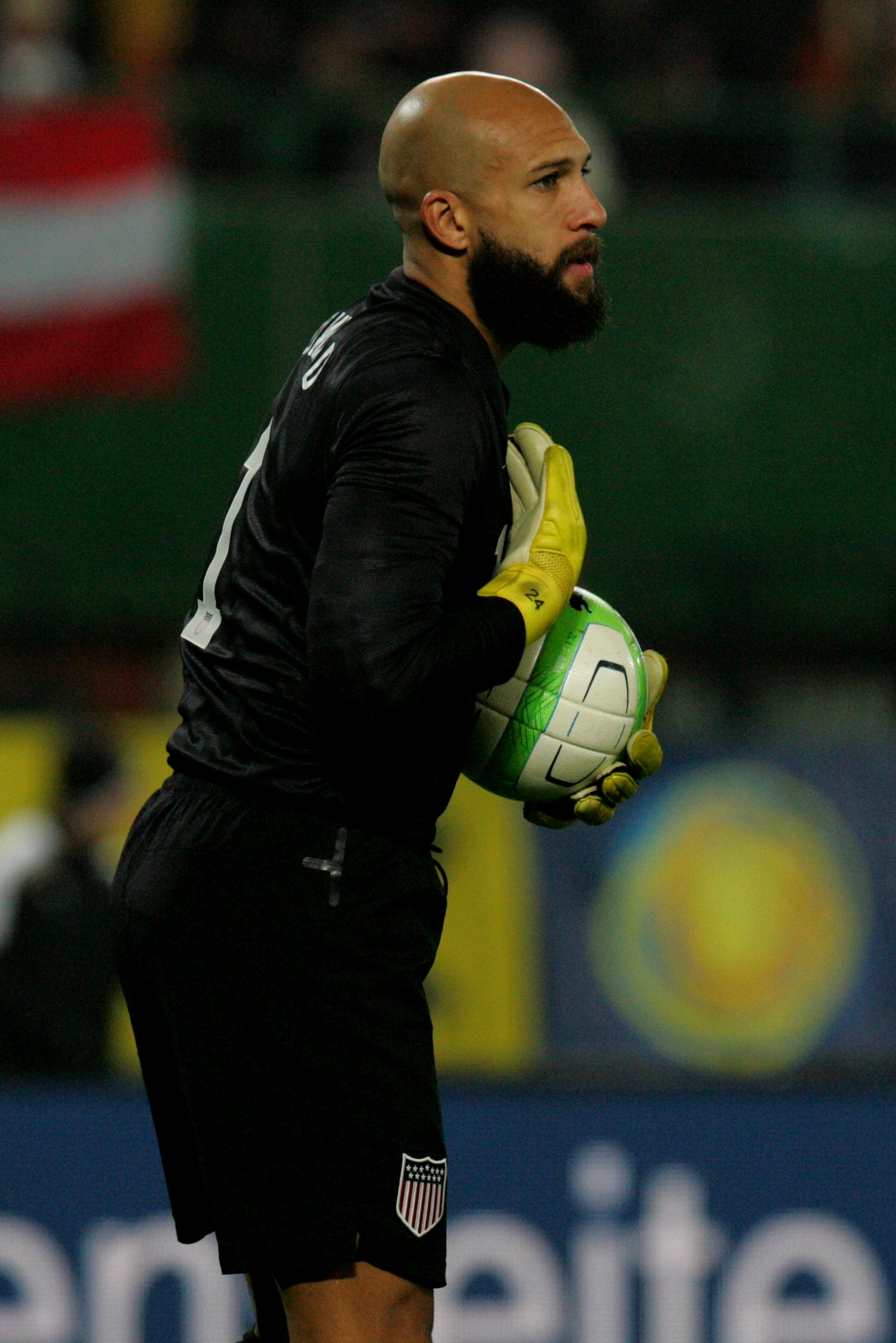
Tim Howard

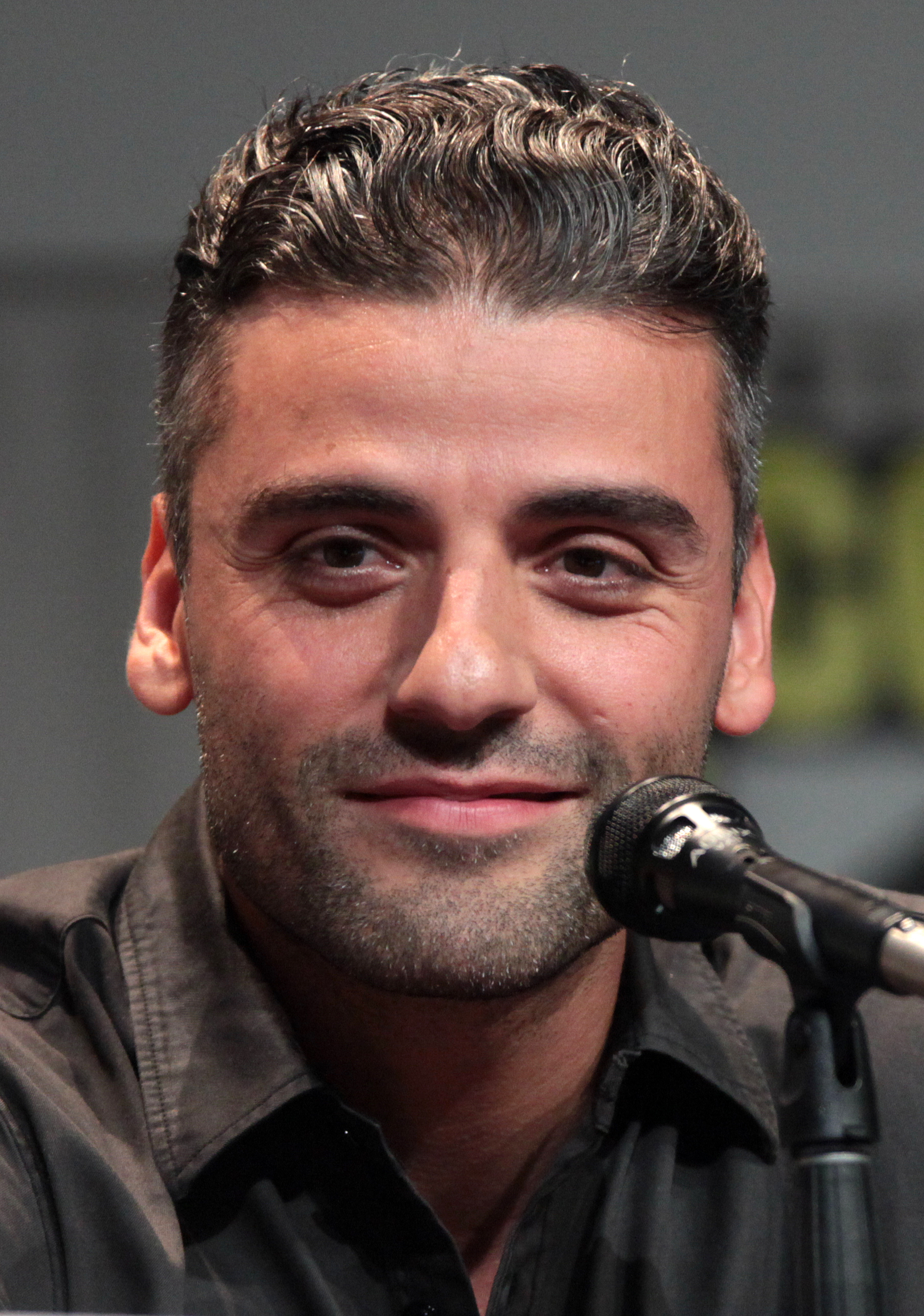
Oscar Isaac

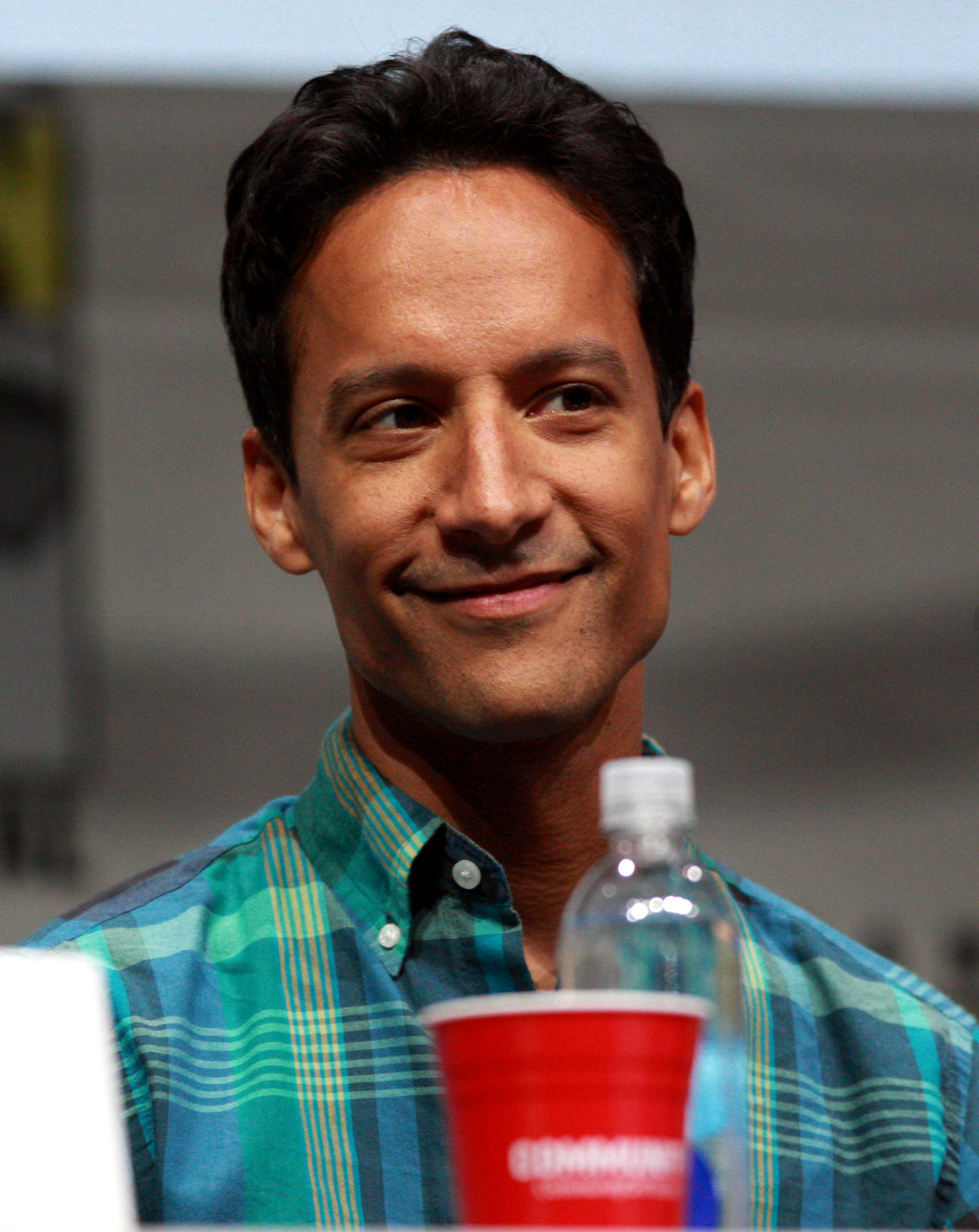
Danny Pudi

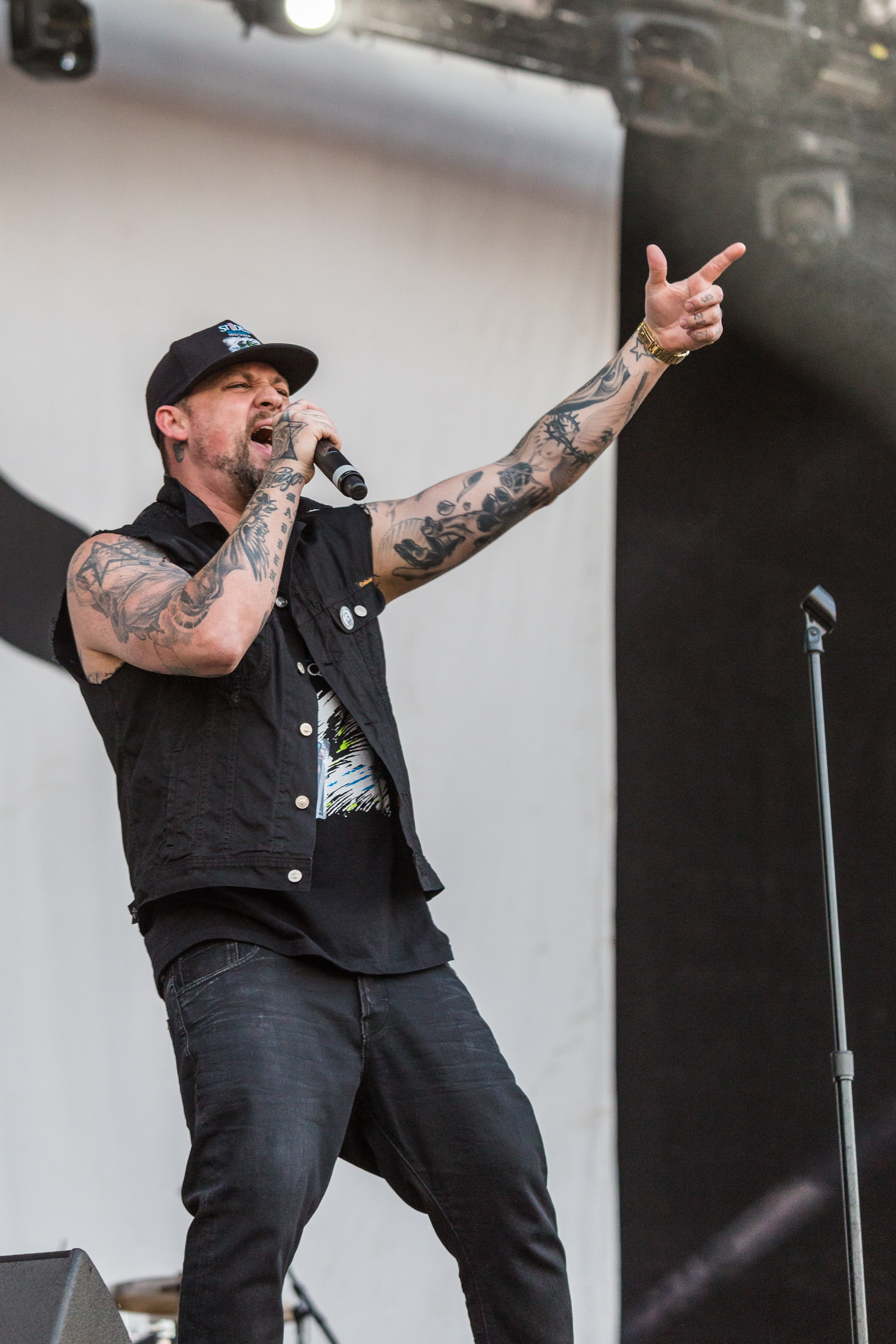
Joel Madden

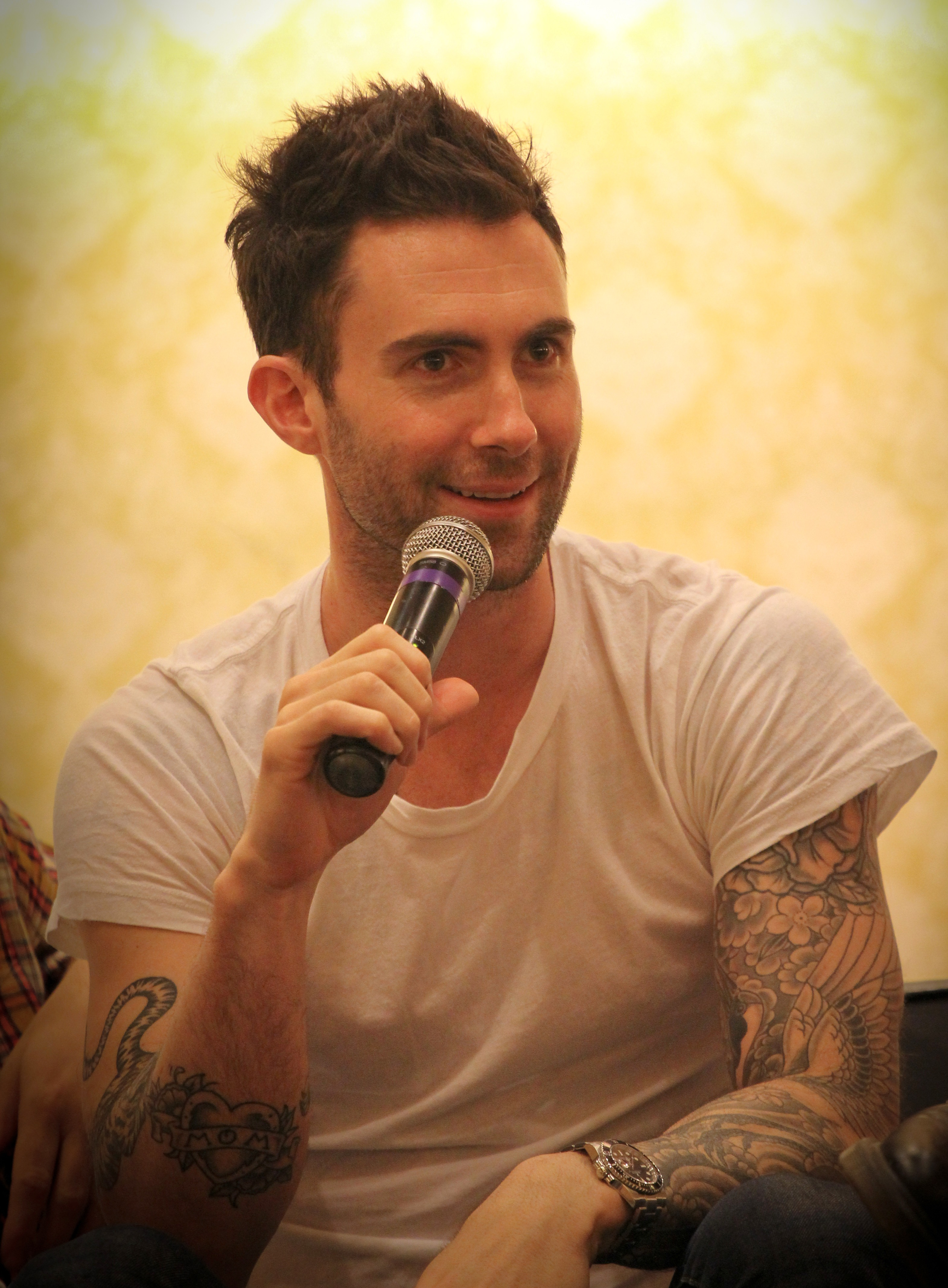
Adam Levine

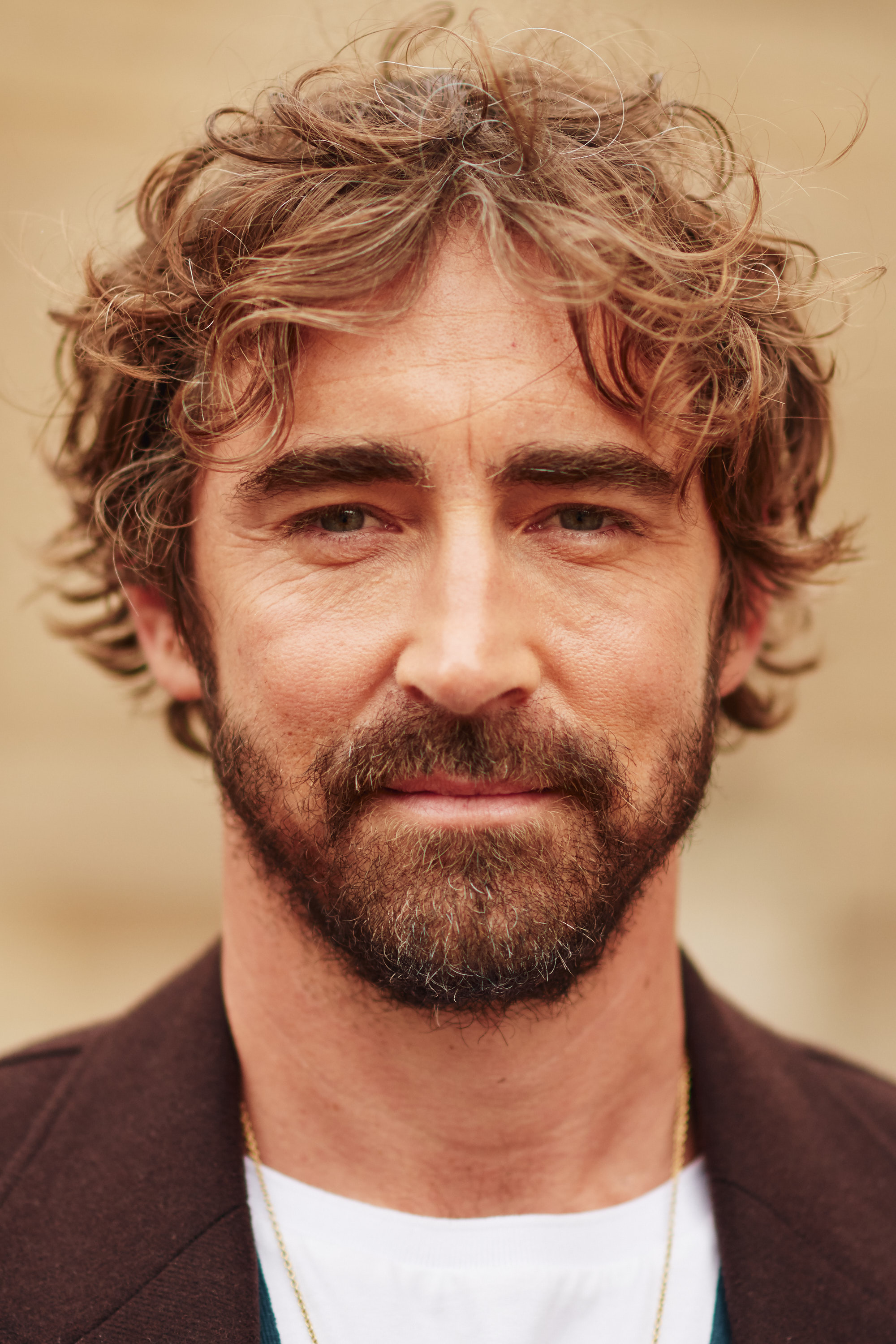
Lee Pace

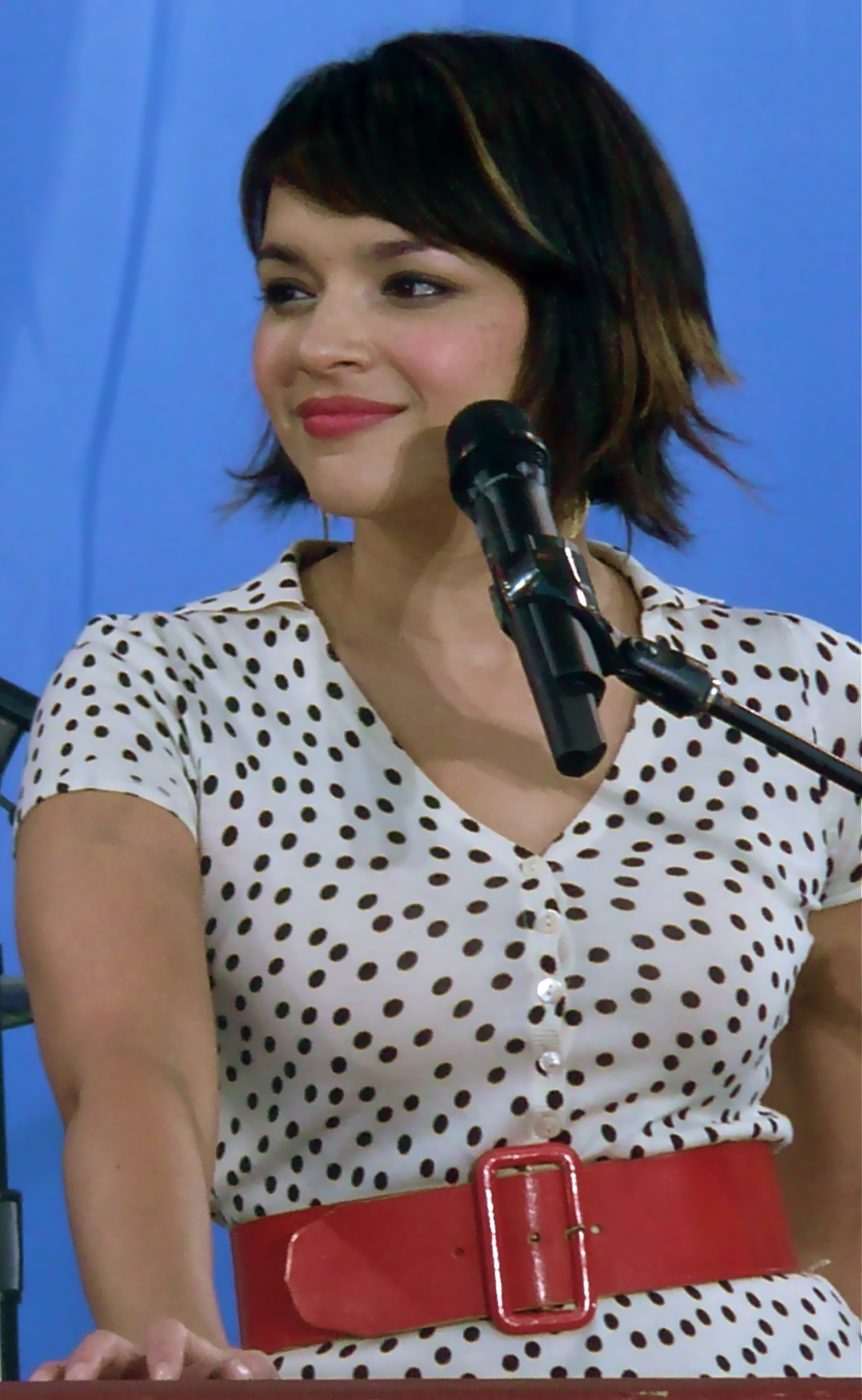
Norah Jones

- March 4
  - Ben Fouhy, New Zealand flatwater canoeist
  - Geoff Huegill, Australian swimmer
- March 5
  - Martin Axenrot, Swedish metal drummer
  - Riki Lindhome, American actress and comedian
  - Tang Gonghong, Chinese weightlifter
- March 6
  - Érik Bédard, Canadian pitcher
  - Tim Howard, American soccer player
- March 7
  - Stephanie Anne Mills, Canadian voice actress
  - Ricardo Rosselló, Puerto Rican politician, Governor of Puerto Rico
- March 8
  - Jasmine You, Japanese musician (d. 2009)
  - Tom Chaplin, British singer (Keane)
- March 9
  - Oscar Isaac, Guatemalan-American actor
  - Melina Perez, American professional wrestler
- March 10 - Danny Pudi, American actor
- March 12 – Pete Doherty, British singer and guitarist (The Libertines, Babyshambles)
- March 13 – Johan Santana, Venezuelan baseball player
- March 14
  - Nicolas Anelka, French footballer
  - Gao Ling, Chinese badminton player
  - Chris Klein, American actor
  - Michele Riondino, Italian actor
- March 16 – Adriana Fonseca, Mexican actress and dancer
- March 17 – Samoa Joe, American professional wrestler
- March 18
  - Shola Ama, English singer
  - Adam Levine, American singer (Maroon 5)
- March 19
  - Emil Dimitriev, Macedonian politician, Prime Minister
  - Ivan Ljubičić, Croatian tennis player and coach
  - Hedo Türkoğlu, Turkish basketball player
- March 20
  - Freema Agyeman, British actress
  - Daniel Cormier, American retired mixed martial artist
  - Bianca Lawson, American actress
  - Silvia Navarro, Spanish handball player
- March 23
  - Mark Buehrle, American baseball player
  - Bryan Fletcher, American football player
  - Misty Hyman, American swimmer
- March 24
  - Gaitana, Ukrainian singer and songwriter
  - Lake Bell, American actress and filmmaker
- March 25
  - Lee Pace, American actor
  - Gorilla Zoe, American rapper
- March 26 – Juliana Paes, Brazilian actress and model
- March 28 – Shakib Khan, Bangladeshi film actor, producer, singer, film organiser and media personalities
- March 29 – Estela Giménez, Spanish gymnast
- March 30
  - Daniel Arenas, Colombian-Mexican actor
  - Jose Pablo Cantillo, American actor
  - Norah Jones, American musician
  - Anatoliy Tymoshchuk, Ukrainian football player and coach

=== April ===
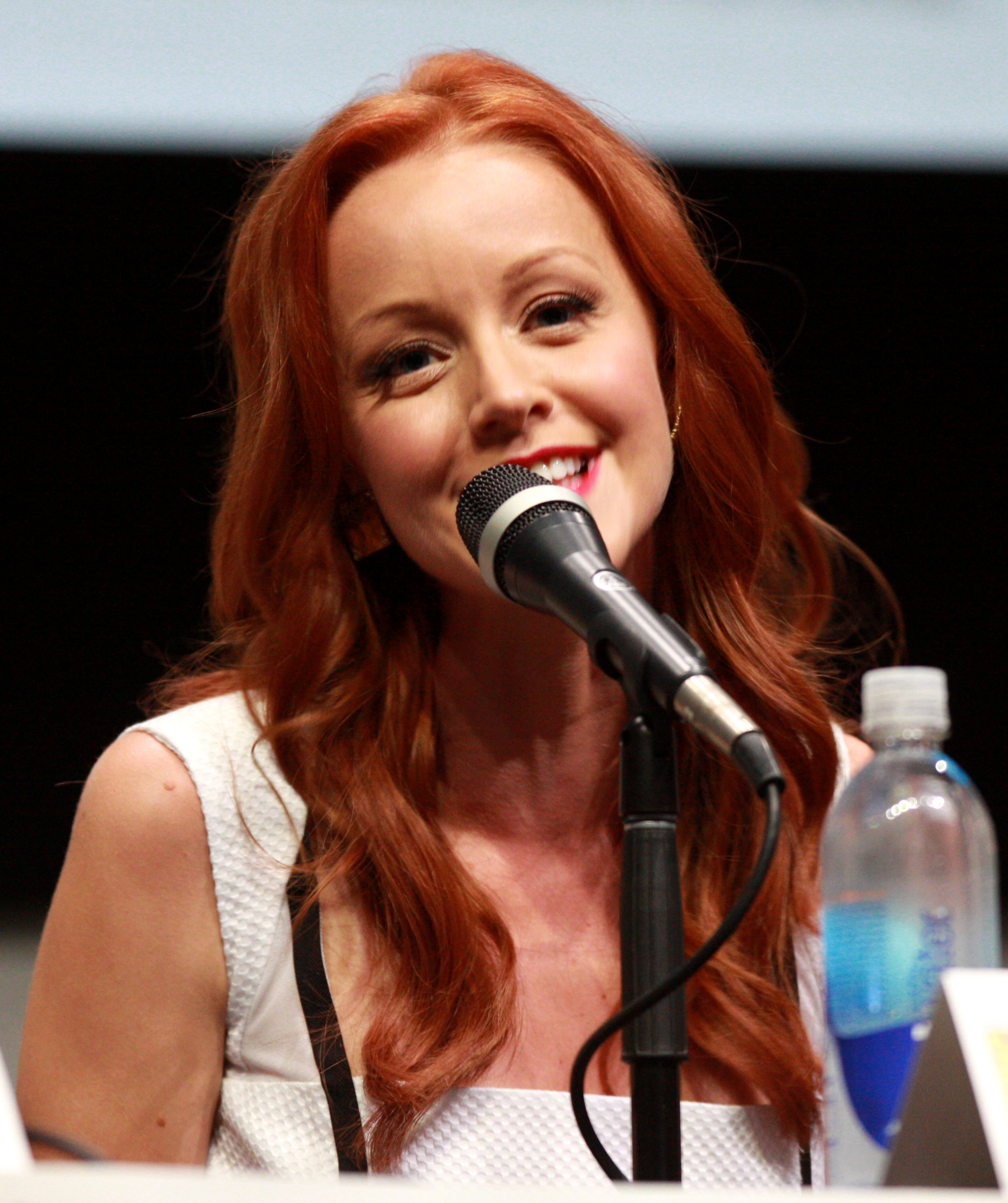
Lindy Booth

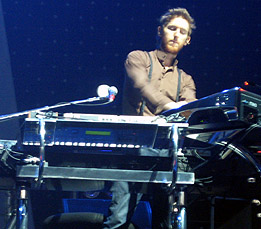
Jesse Carmichael

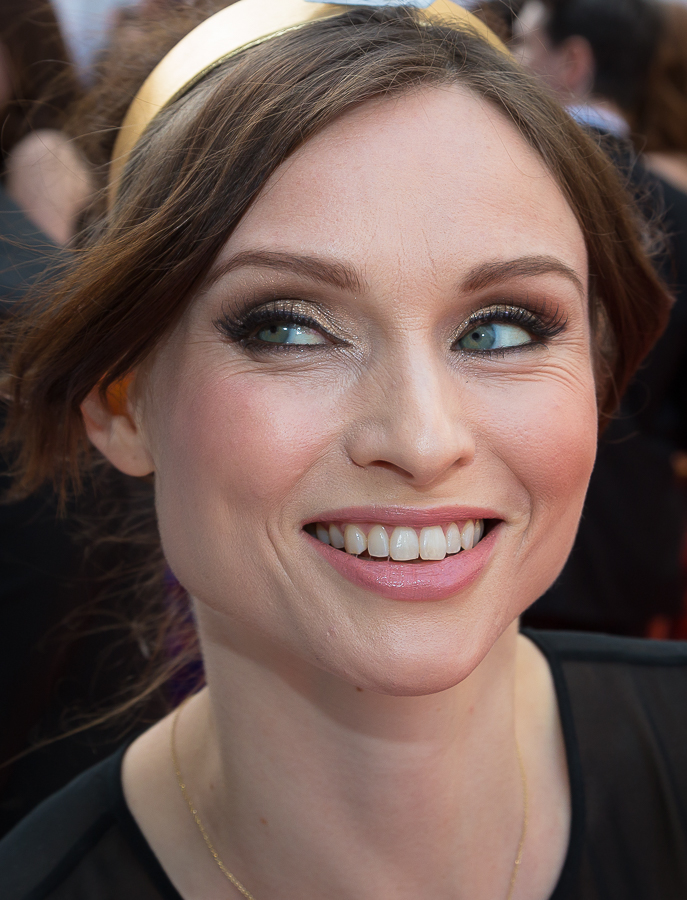
Sophie Ellis-Bextor

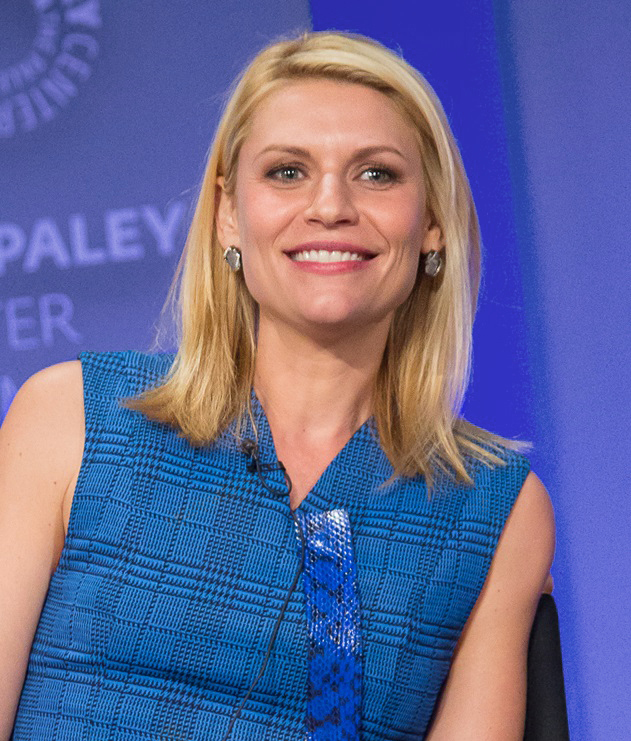
Claire Danes

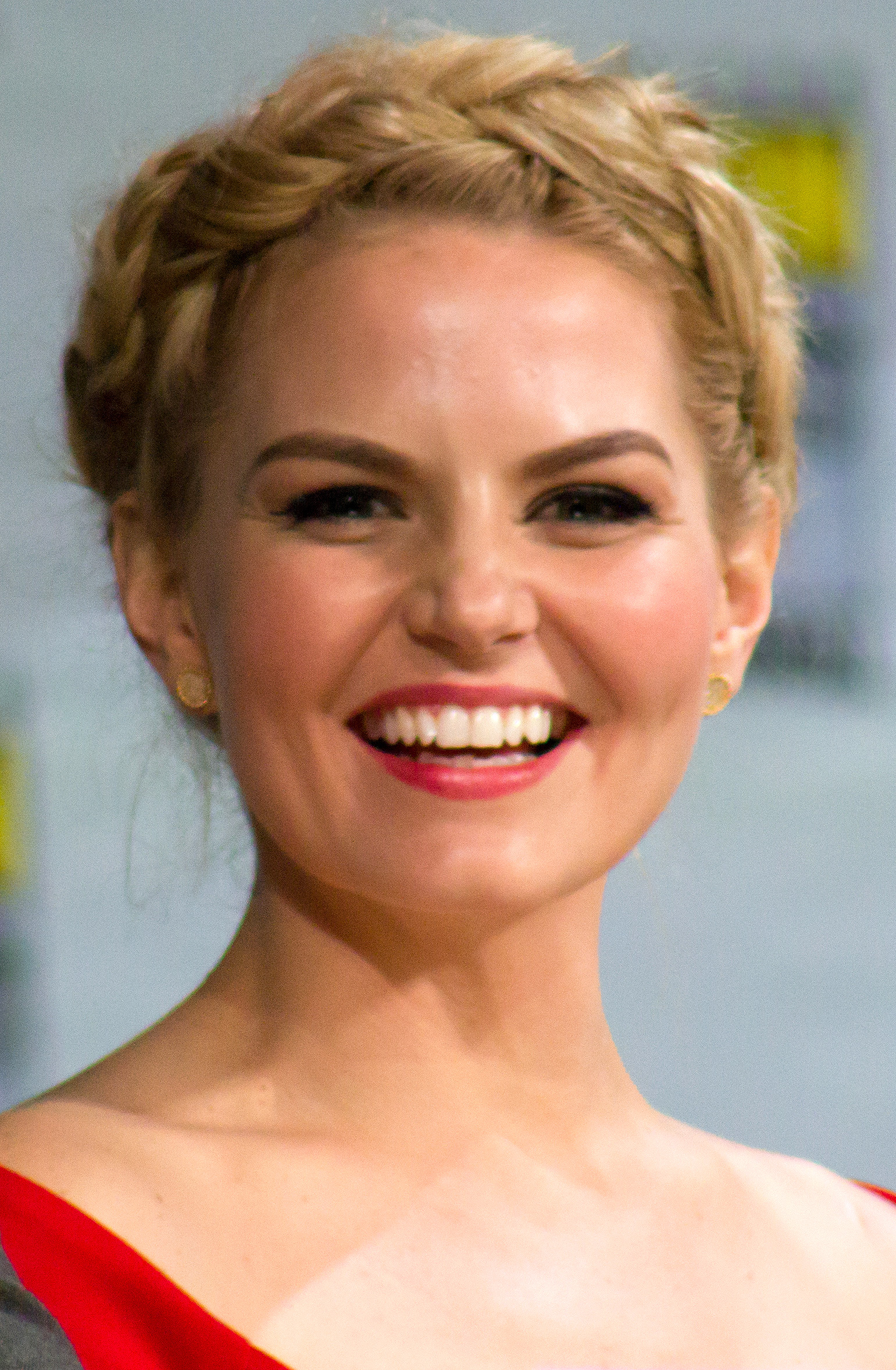
Jennifer Morrison

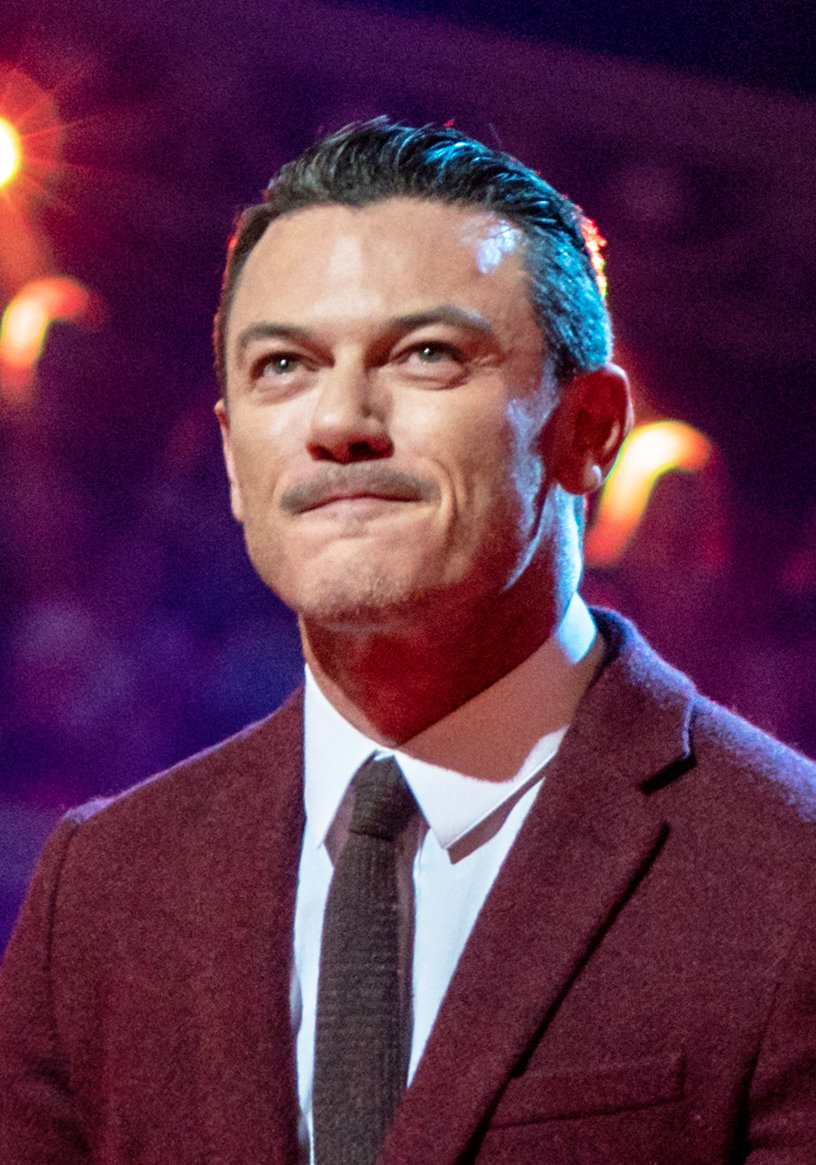
Luke Evans

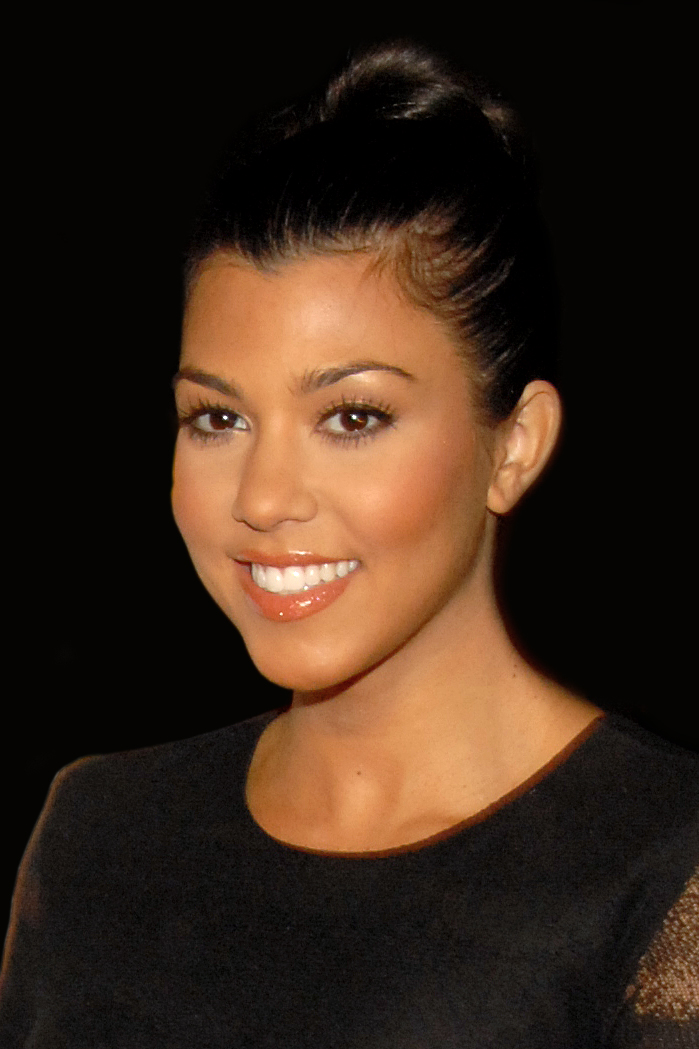
Kourtney Kardashian

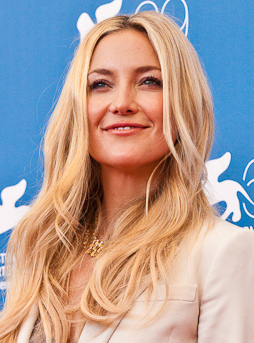
Kate Hudson

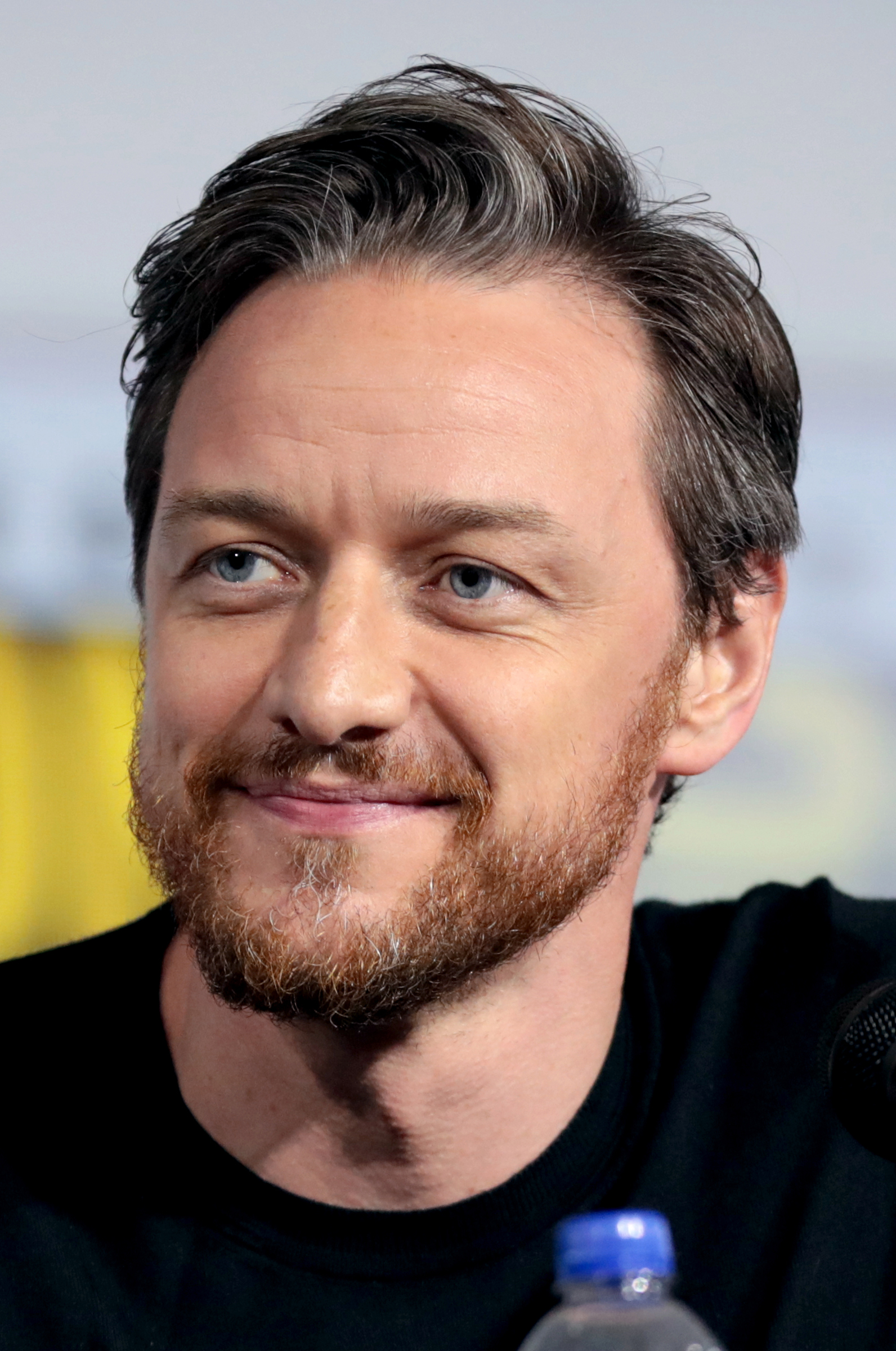
James McAvoy

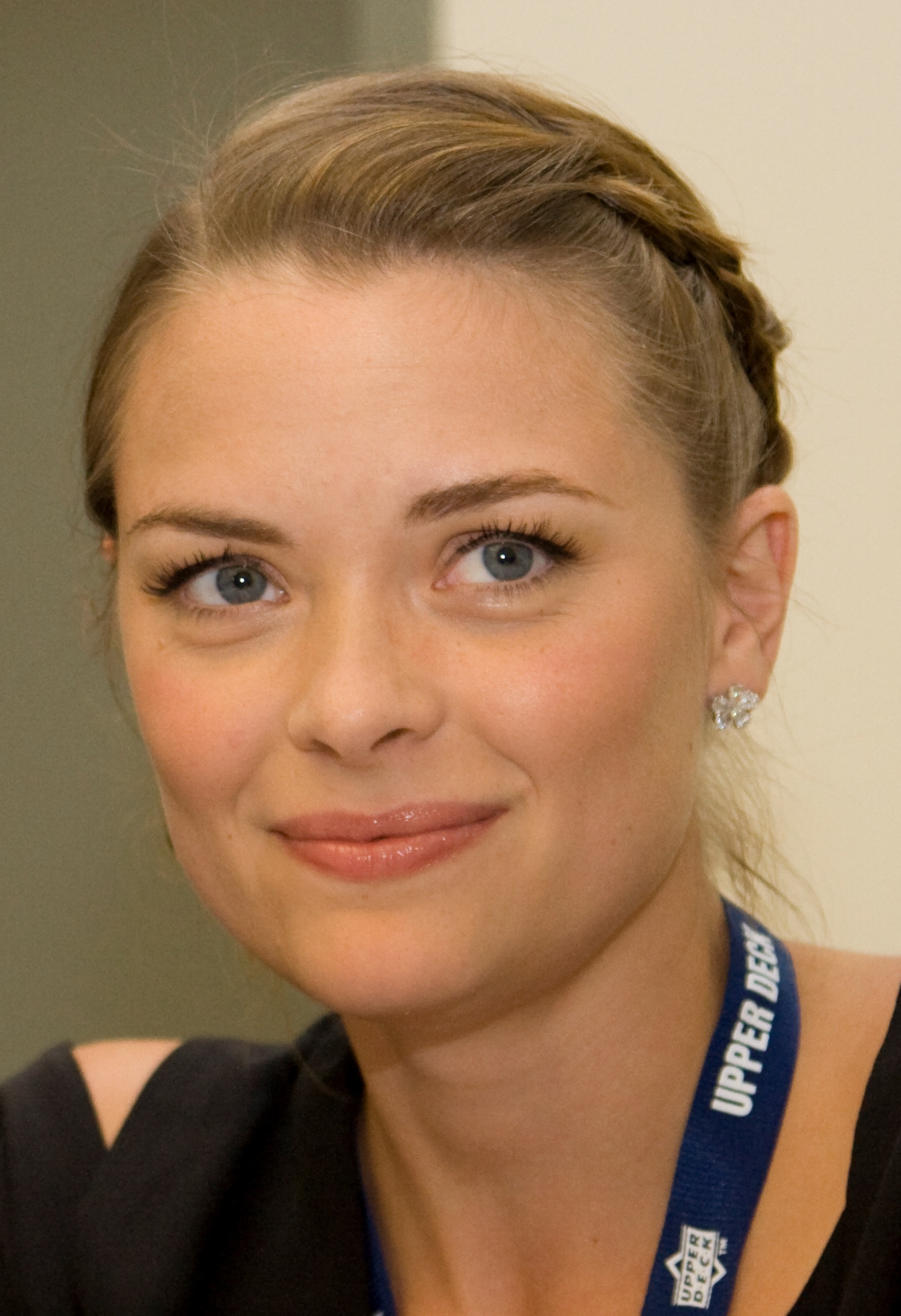
Jaime King

- April 1 – Ruth Beitia, Spanish high jumper and politician
- April 2
  - Lindy Booth, Canadian actress
  - Jesse Carmichael, American musician (Maroon 5)
- April 3
  - Živilė Balčiūnaitė, Lithuanian long-distance runner
  - Grégoire, French singer-songwriter
  - Sasa Ognenovski, Australian footballer
- April 4
  - Heath Ledger, Australian actor and music video director (d. 2008)
  - Roberto Luongo, Canadian ice hockey goaltender
  - Maksim Opalev, Russian canoeist
  - Natasha Lyonne, American actress
- April 5
  - Sarah Dobbe, Dutch politician
  - Timo Hildebrand, German footballer
- April 8
  - Mohamed Kader, Togolese footballer
  - Alexi Laiho, Finnish musician (Children of Bodom) (d. 2020)
  - David Petruschin, American drag queen
- April 9
  - Sebastián Silva, Chilean director, actor, screenwriter, painter and musician
  - Keshia Knight Pulliam, African-American actress
  - Mario Matt, Austrian alpine skier
- April 10
  - Rachel Corrie, American activist and diarist (d. 2003)
  - Tsuyoshi Domoto, Japanese entertainer (KinKi Kids)
  - Sophie Ellis-Bextor, British singer
- April 11
  - Sebastien Grainger, Canadian singer and musician
  - Michel Riesen, Swiss ice hockey player
  - Josh Server, American actor
- April 12
  - Claire Danes, American actress
  - Mateja Kežman, Serbian footballer
  - Josh Turek, American politician and former wheelchair basketball player, Senator-elect from Iowa
  - Jennifer Morrison, American actress
- April 13 – Baron Davis, American basketball player
- April 14
  - Pedro Andrade, Brazilian journalist and model
  - Rebecca DiPietro, American model
  - Pierre Roland, Indonesian actor
- April 15
  - Karen David, Indian born-Canadian actress and singer
  - Luke Evans, Welsh actor and singer
- April 17 – Sung Si-kyung, South Korean singer
- April 18
  - Michael Bradley, American basketball player
  - Anthony Davidson, English racing driver
  - Yusuke Kamiji, Japanese actor
  - Kourtney Kardashian, American reality television star
- April 19
  - Kate Hudson, American actress and co-founder of Fabletics
  - Antoaneta Stefanova, Bulgarian chess player
- April 20 – Teoh Beng Hock, Malaysian journalist (d. 2009)
- April 21
  - James McAvoy, Scottish actor
  - Karin Rask, Estonian actress
- April 22 – Daniel Johns, Australian musician (Silverchair)
- April 23
  - Yana Gupta, Indian actress of Czech origin
  - Jaime King, American actress
  - Joanna Krupa, Polish-born American model and actress
- April 24
  - Laurentia Tan, Singaporean Paralympic equestrienne
  - Avey Tare, American musician
  - Adam Andretti, American race car driver
- April 25
  - Andreas Küttel, Swiss ski jumper
  - Andrea Osvárt, Hungarian actress
- April 27 – Travis Meeks, American musician (Days of the New)
- April 28 – Bahram Radan, Iranian actor
- April 29
  - Jo O'Meara, English singer (S Club 7)
- April 30 – Shelley Calene-Black, American voice actress

=== May ===
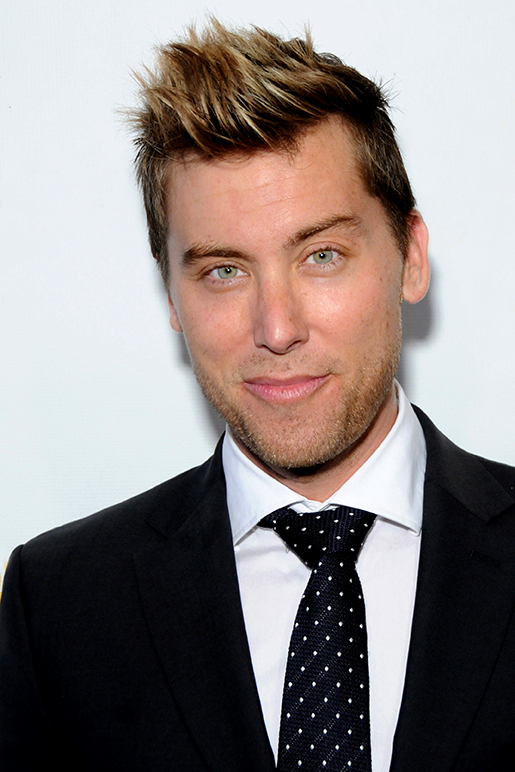
Lance Bass

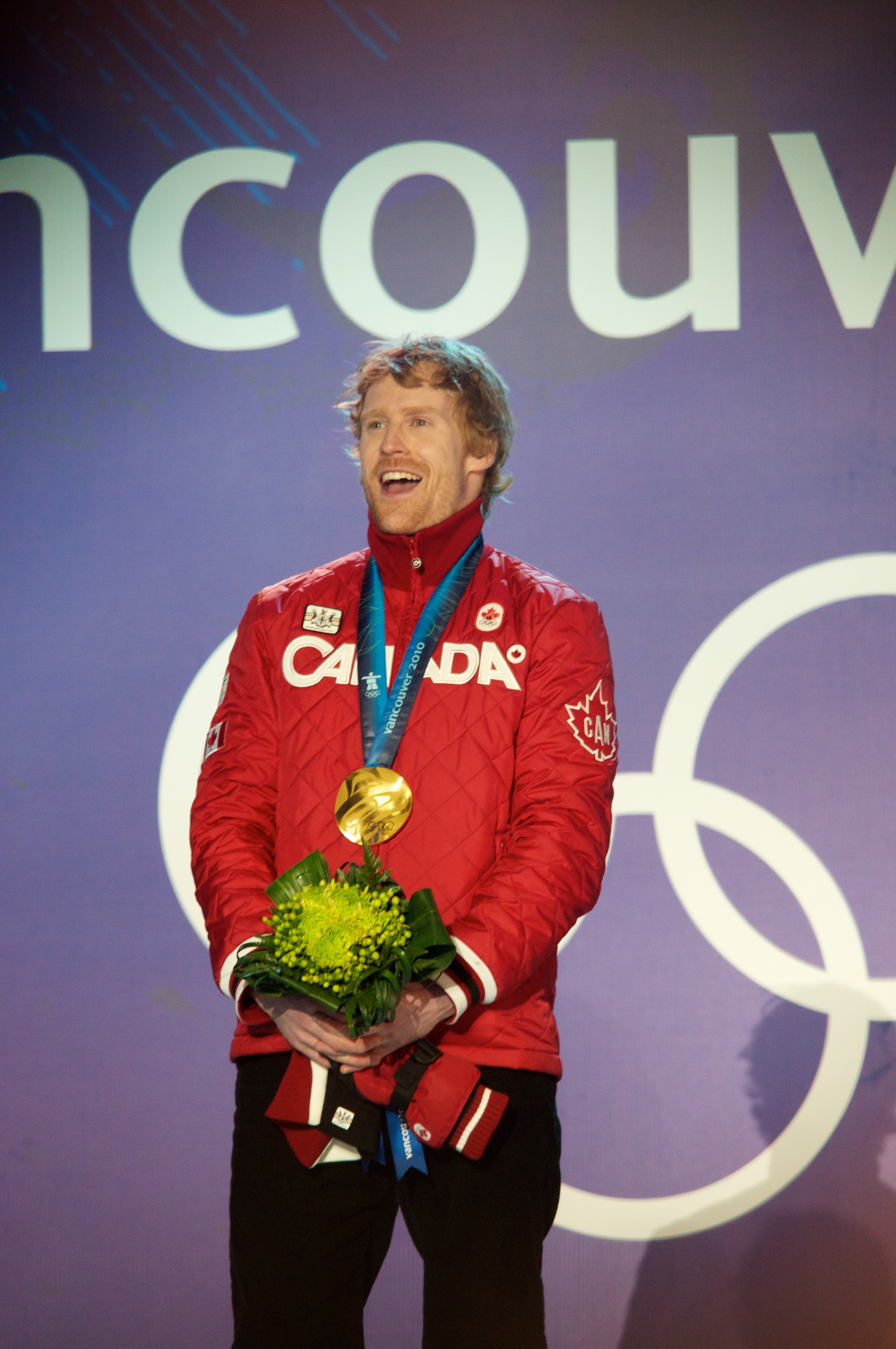
Jon Montgomery

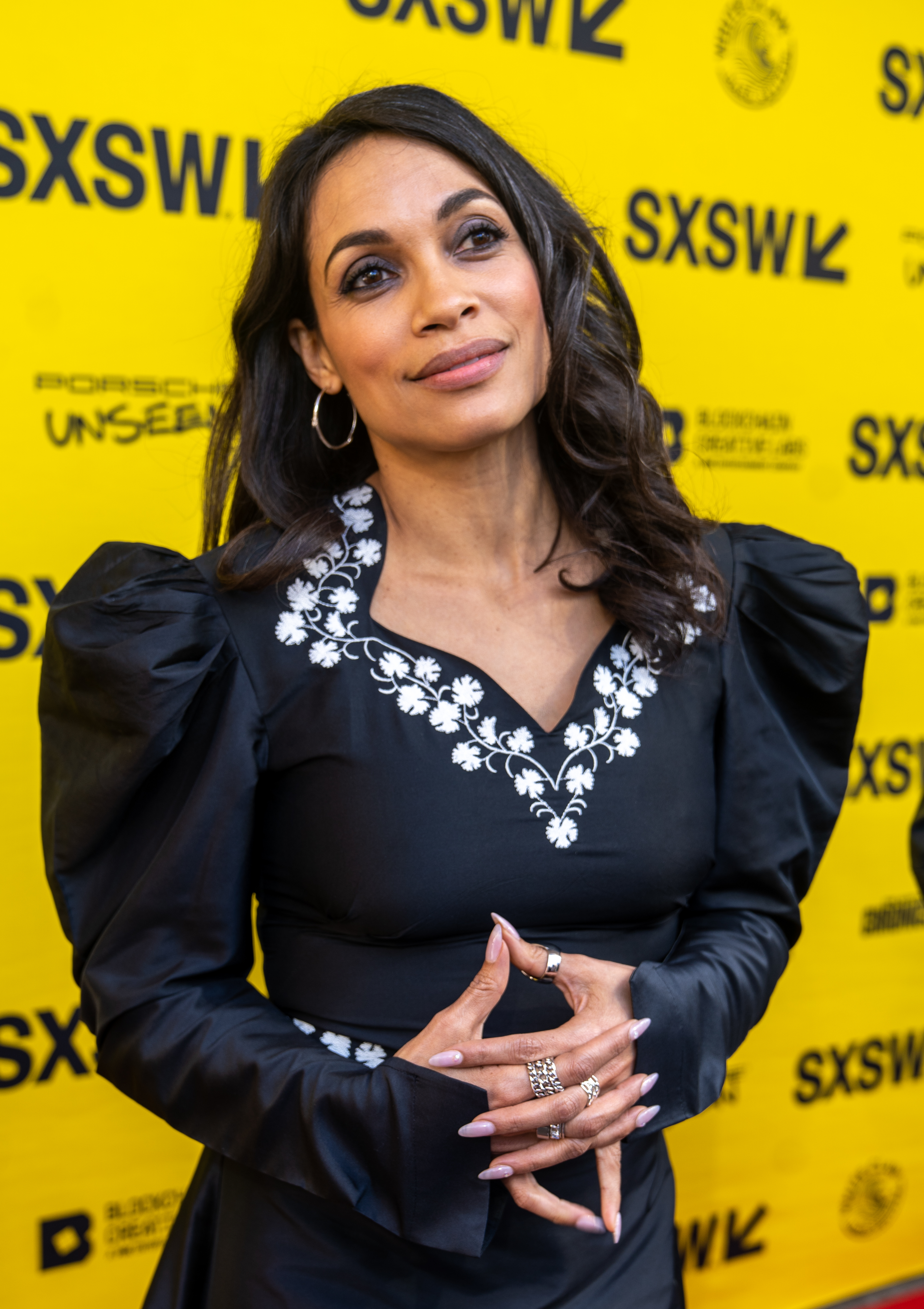
Rosario Dawson

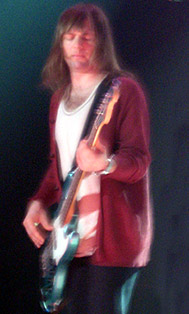
Mickey Madden

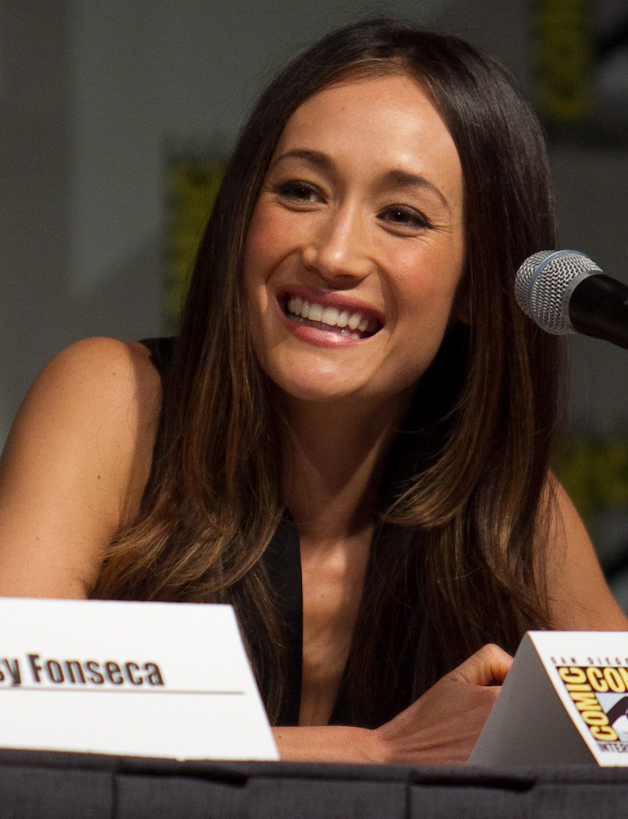
Maggie Q

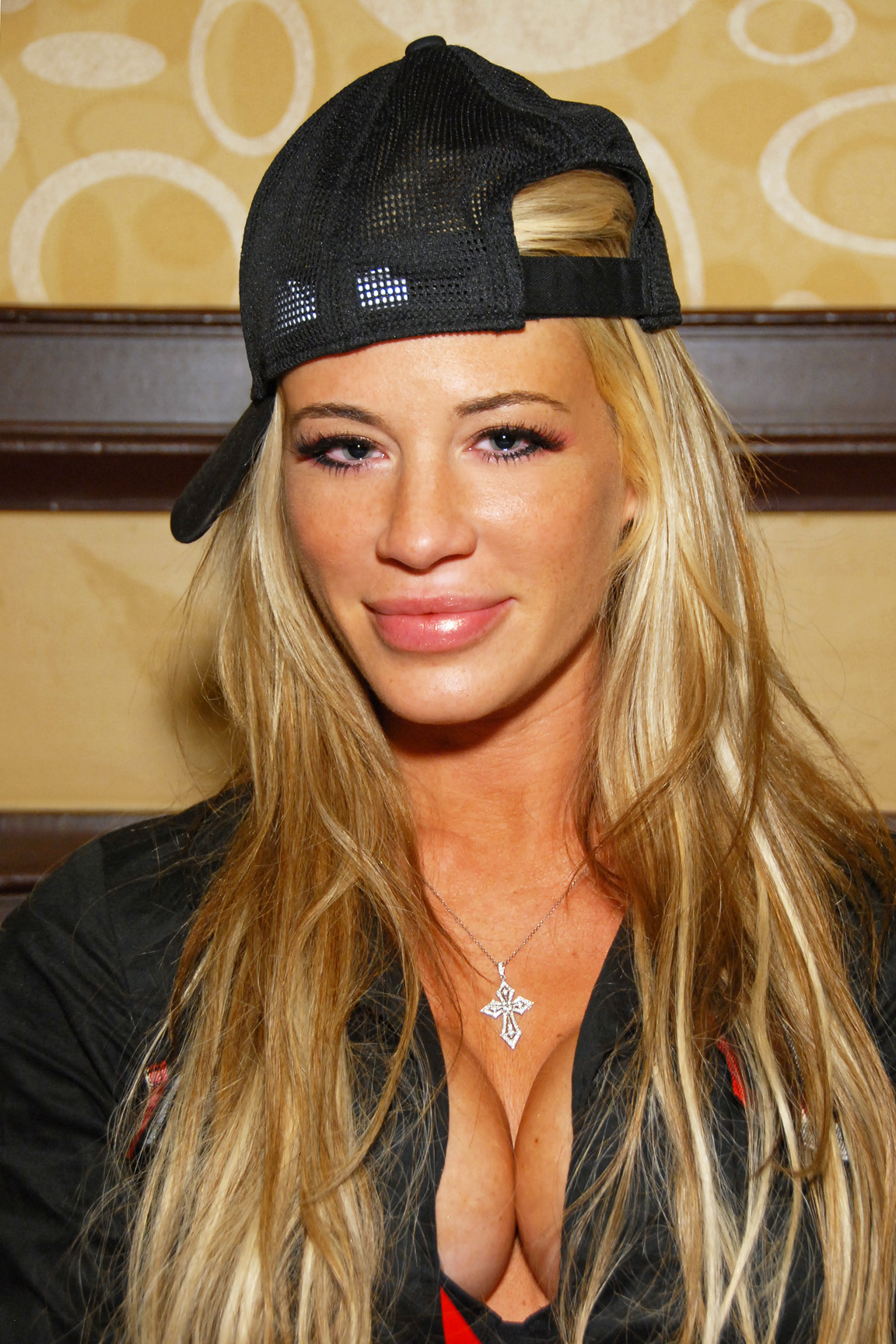
Ashley Massaro

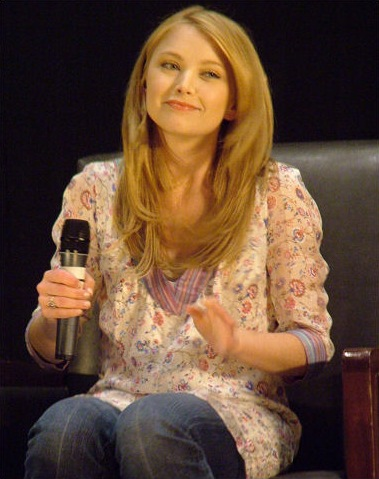
Elisabeth Harnois

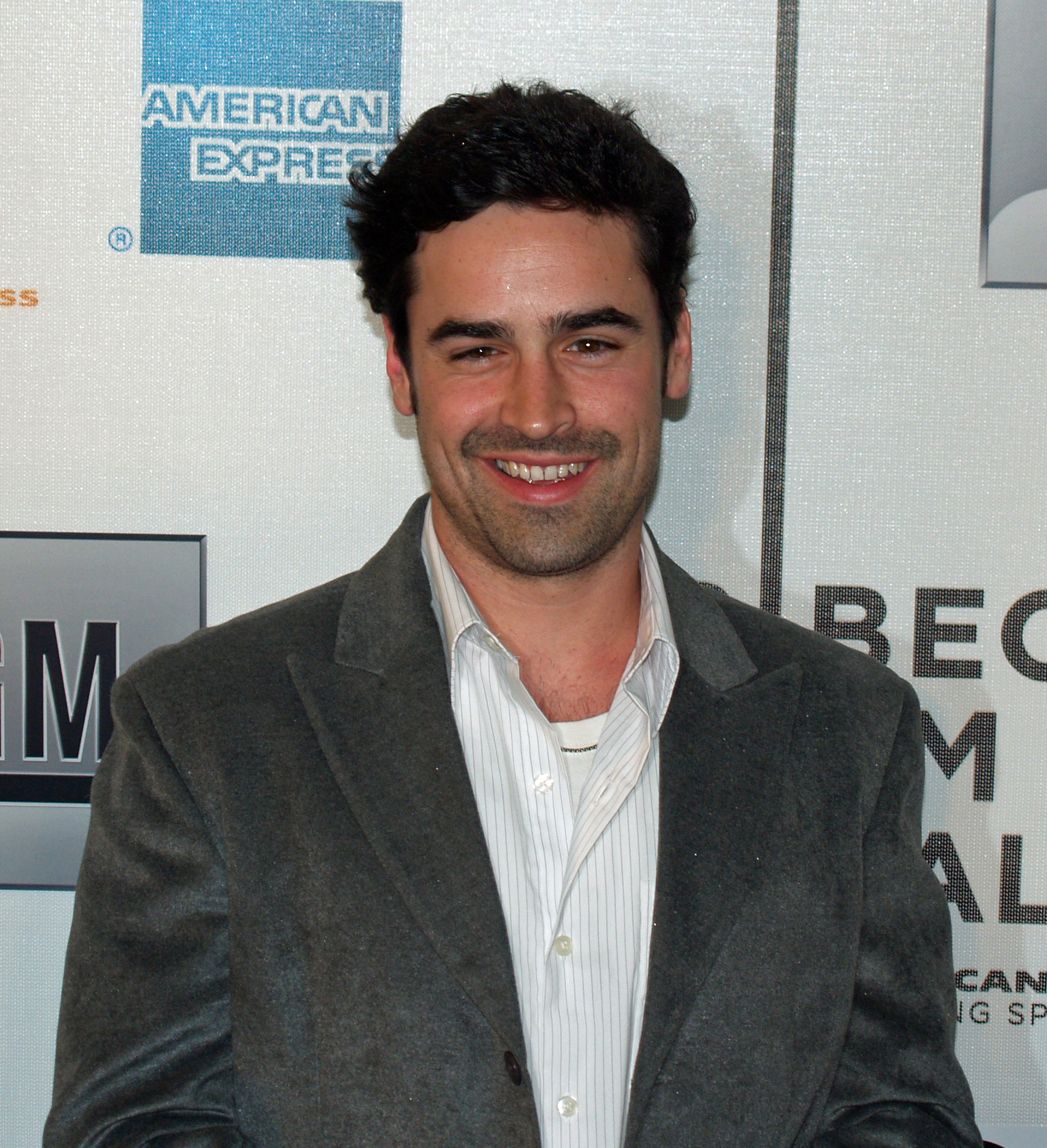
Jesse Bradford

- May 1
  - Roman Lyashenko, Russian ice hockey player (d. 2003)
  - Lars Berger, Norwegian biathlete and cross-country skier
  - Mauro Bergamasco, Italian rugby union player
- May 2 – Jason Chimera, Canadian ice hockey player
- May 3
  - Danny Foster, English singer (Hear'Say)
  - Ingrid Isotamm, Estonian actress
- May 4
  - Lance Bass, American singer (NSYNC)
  - Wes Butters, English broadcaster
- May 5 – Vincent Kartheiser, American actor
- May 6
  - Mark Burrier, American cartoonist
  - Kerry Ellis, English stage actress and singer
  - Gerd Kanter, Estonian discus thrower
  - Jon Montgomery, Canadian former skeleton racer and television personality; host of The Amazing Race Canada
- May 8 – Wendy Armoko, Indonesian singer, actor, presenter and comedian
- May 9
  - Pierre Bouvier, Canadian musician
  - Rosario Dawson, American actress
- May 10
  - Marieke Vervoort, Belgian athlete (d. 2019)
  - Lee Hyori, South Korean entertainer
- May 12 – Adrian Serioux, Canadian soccer player
- May 13
  - Mickey Madden, American musician (Maroon 5)
  - Prince Carl Philip, Duke of Värmland
- May 14
  - Urijah Faber, WEC Featherweight Champion
  - Carlos Tenorio, Ecuadorian footballer
- May 15 – James Mackenzie, Scottish actor and TV presenter
- May 16
  - Brandon Lee, Filipino-American gay pornographic film actor
  - Jessica Morris, American actress
  - Barbara Nedeljáková, Slovak actress
- May 18
  - Mariusz Lewandowski, Polish footballer
  - Michal Martikán, Slovak slalom canoeist
  - Jens Bergensten, Swedish game designer and co-founder of the game company Mojang
- May 19
  - Andrea Pirlo, Italian footballer
  - Diego Forlán, Uruguayan football player
- May 20 – Andrew Scheer, Canadian politician
- May 22
  - Maggie Q, American actress
  - Nazanin Boniadi, Iranian-British-American actress
- May 23 – Rasual Butler, American basketball player (d. 2018)
- May 24
  - Frank Mir, American mixed martial artist
  - Tracy McGrady, American basketball player
- May 25 – Jonny Wilkinson, English rugby union player
- May 26
  - Ashley Massaro, American professional wrestler and model (d. 2019)
  - Elisabeth Harnois, American actress
- May 27 – Michael Buonauro, American comic creator
- May 28 – Jesse Bradford, American actor
- May 29 – Brian Kendrick, American wrestler
- May 30
  - Clint Bowyer, American race car driver
  - Fabian Ernst, German footballer
  - Rie Kugimiya, Japanese voice actress and singer

=== June ===
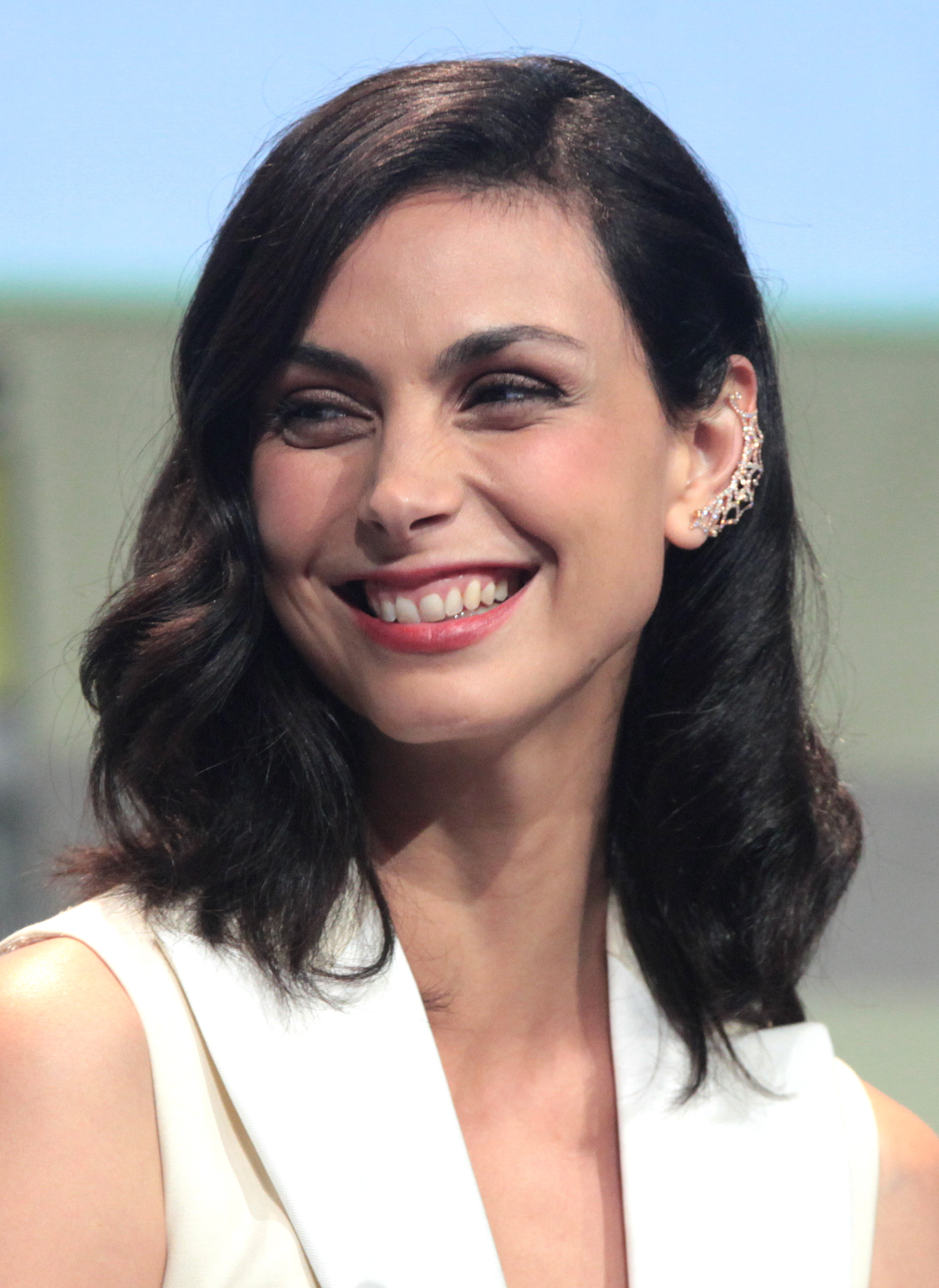
Morena Baccarin

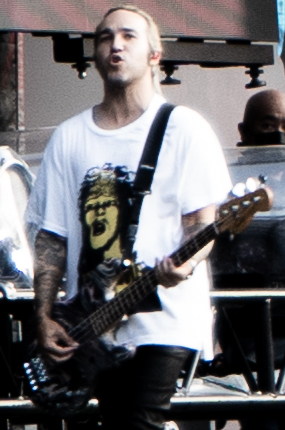
Pete Wentz

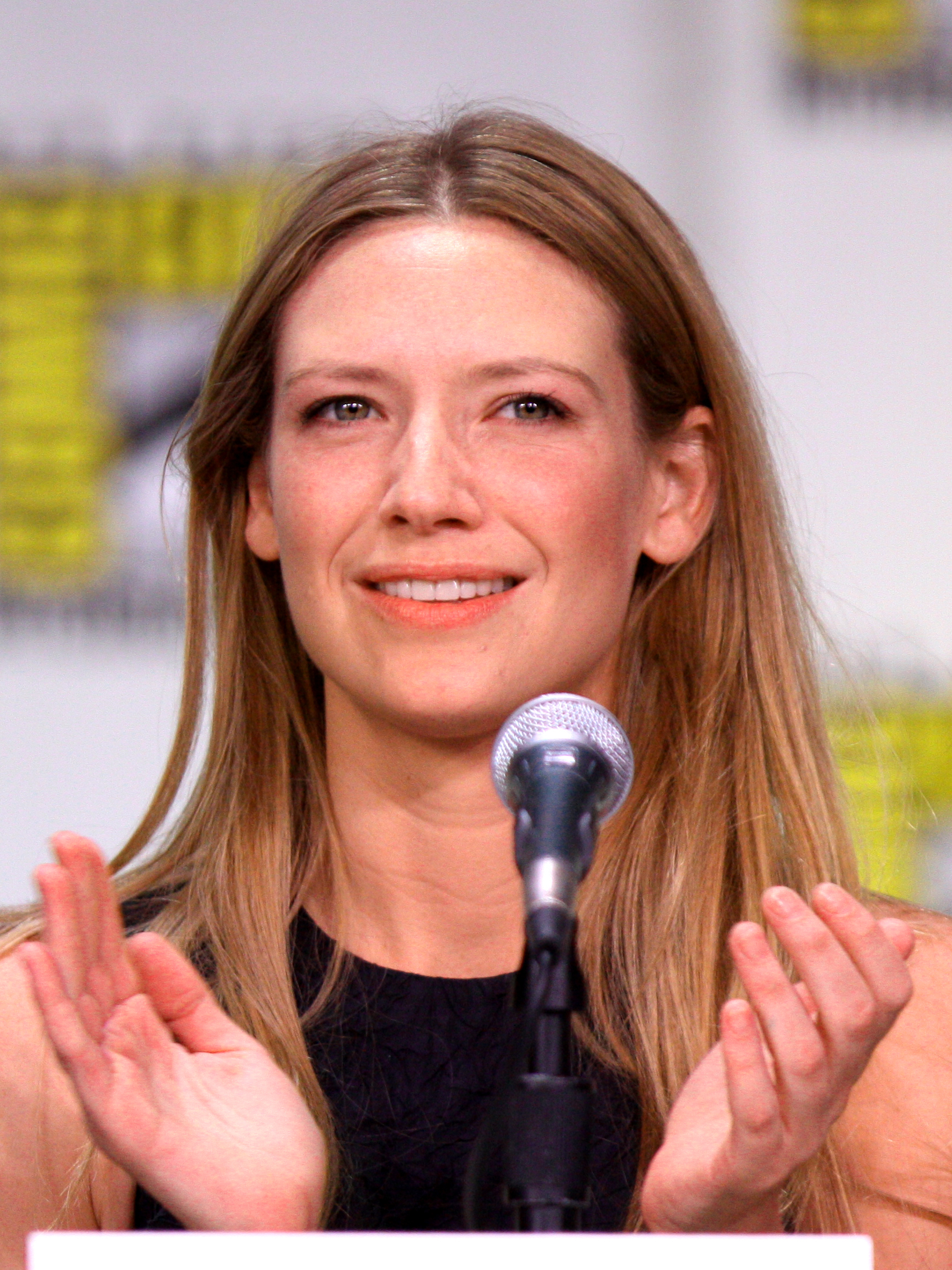
Anna Torv

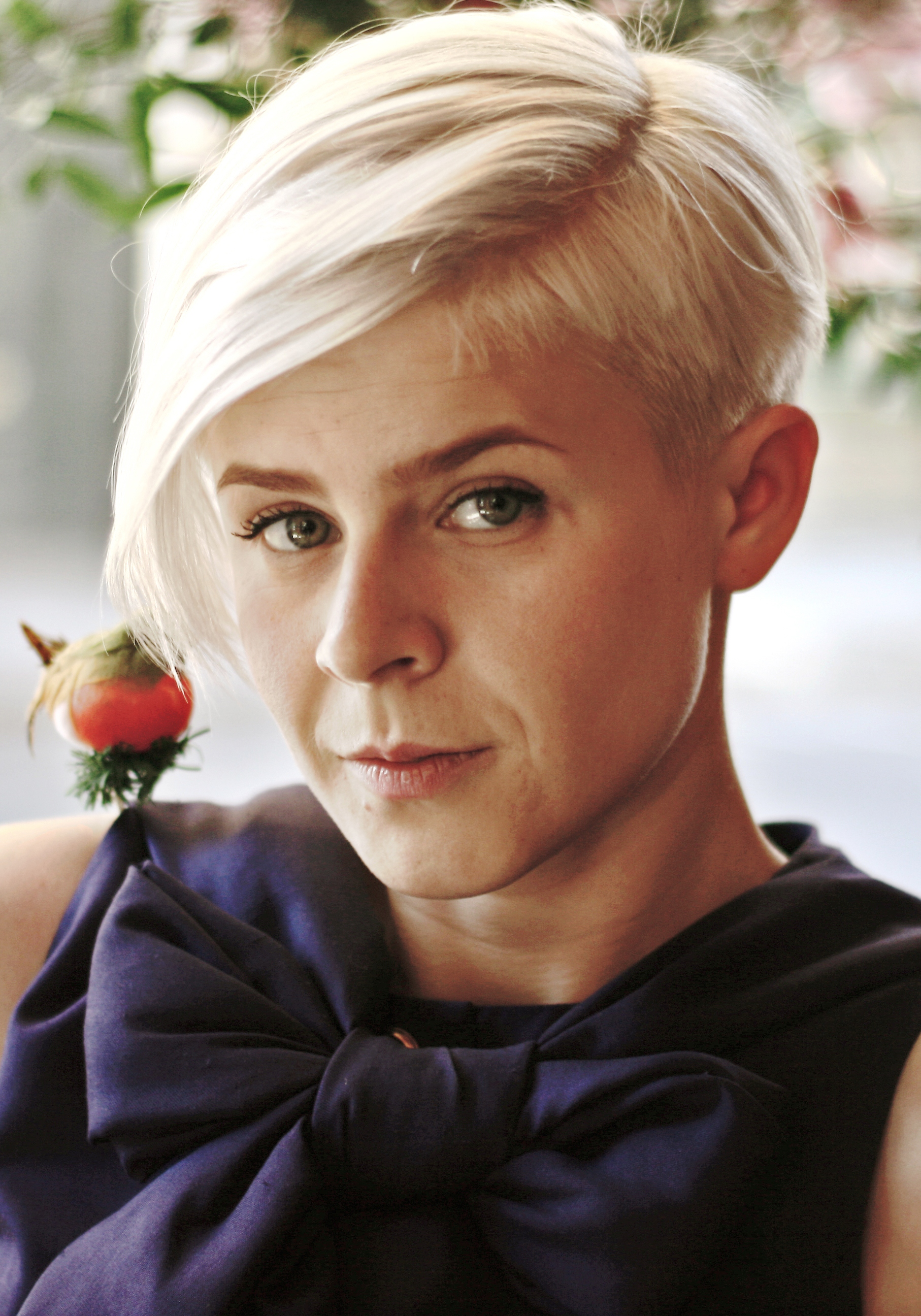
Robyn

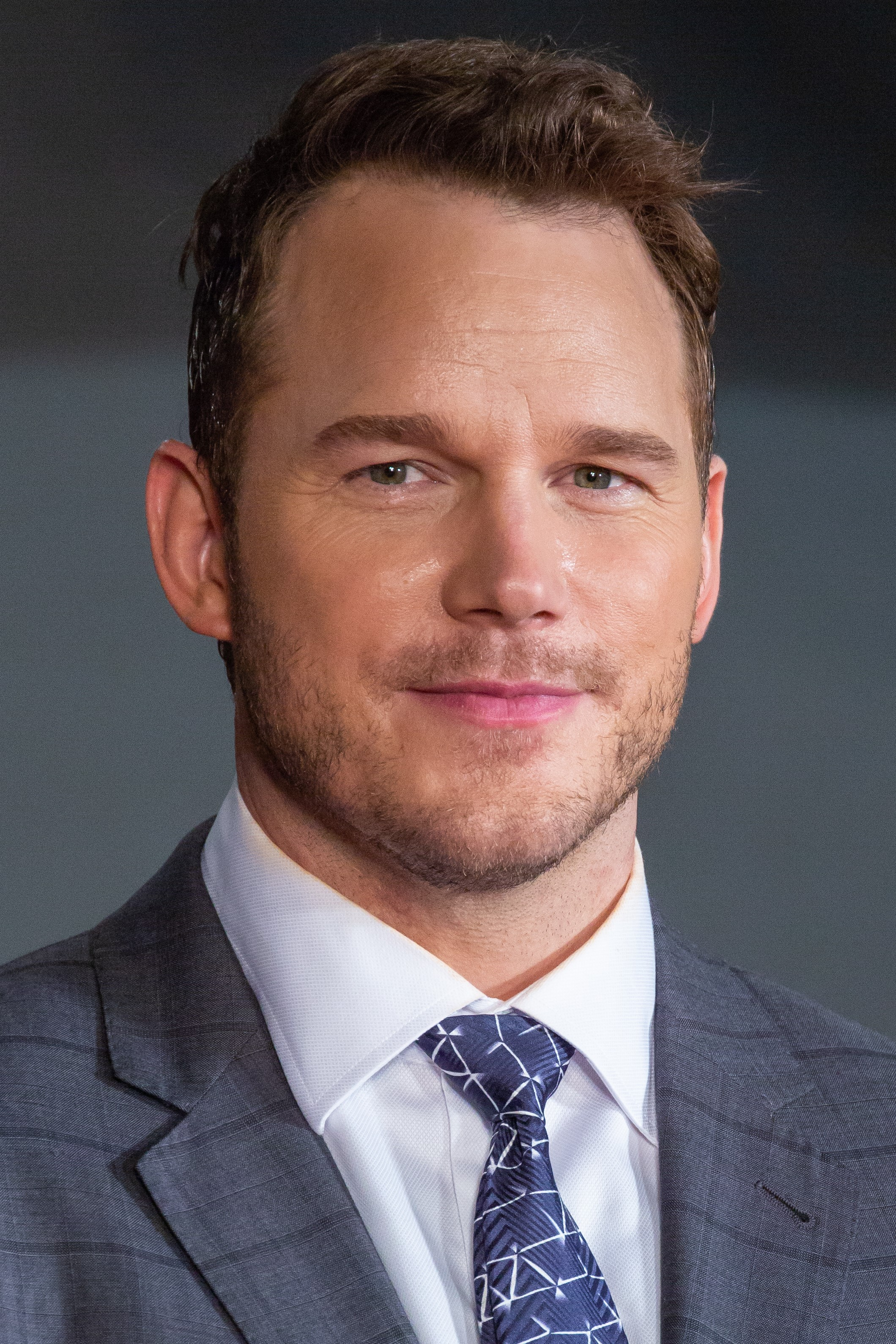
Chris Pratt

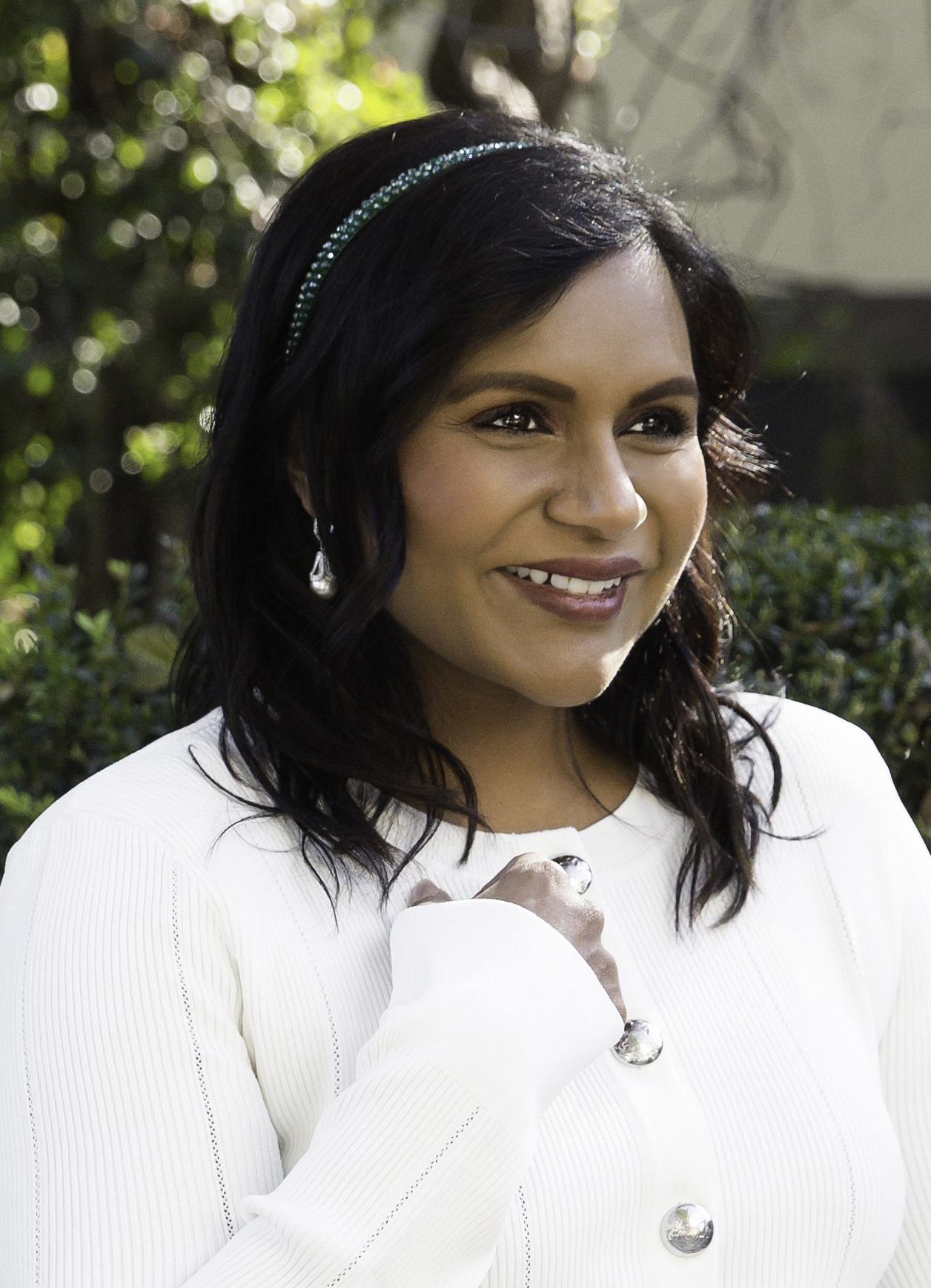
Mindy Kaling

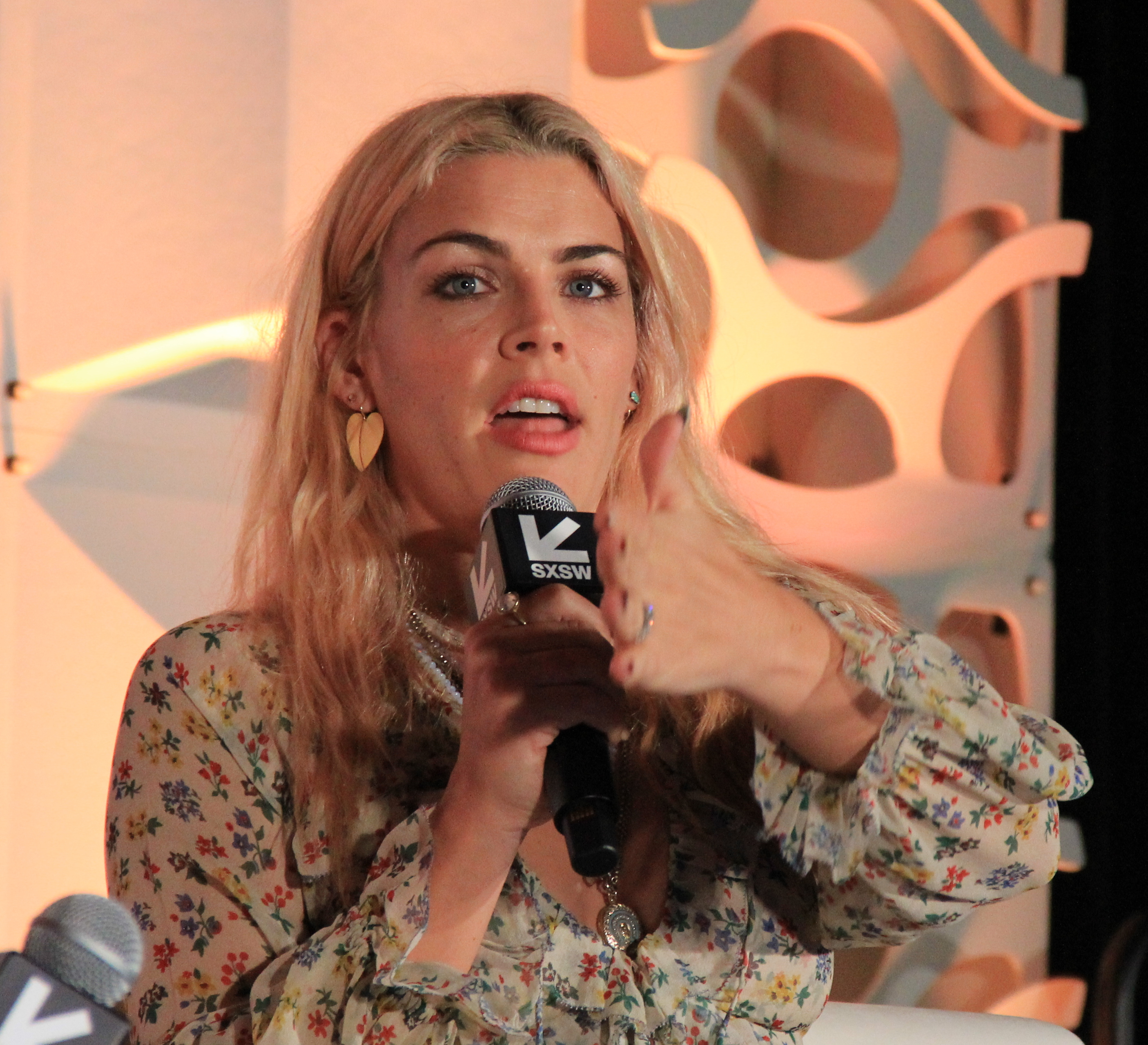
Busy Philipps

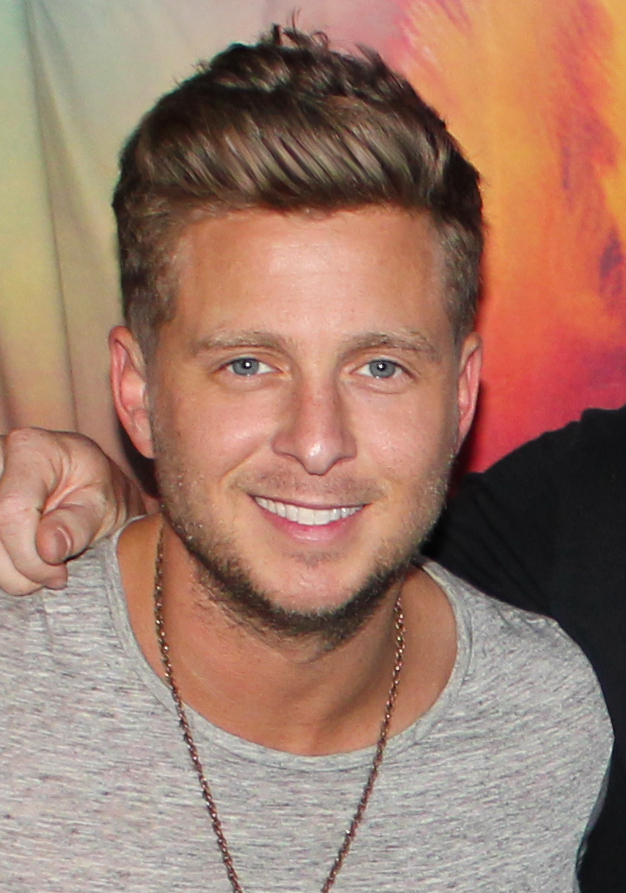
Ryan Tedder

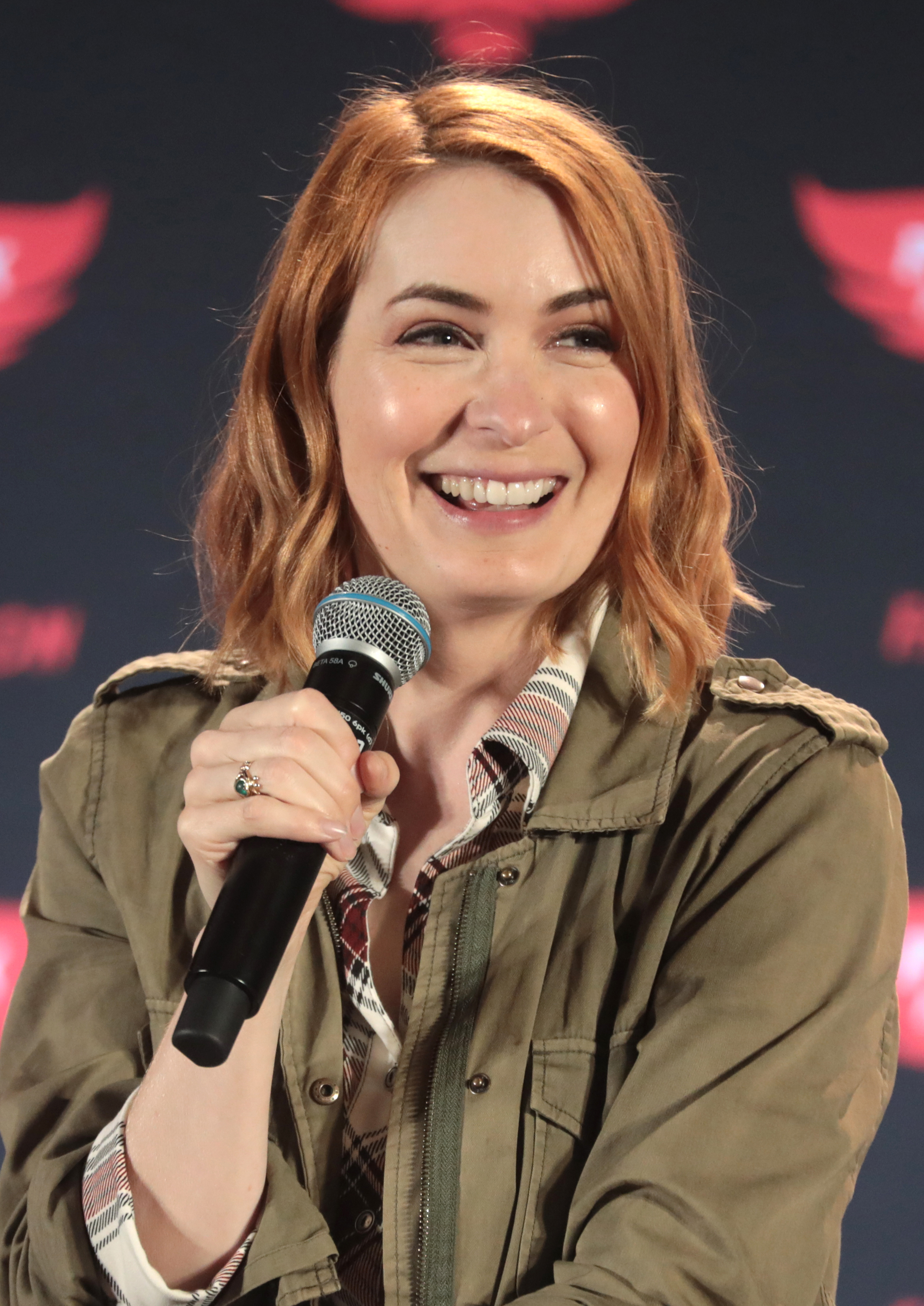
Felicia Day

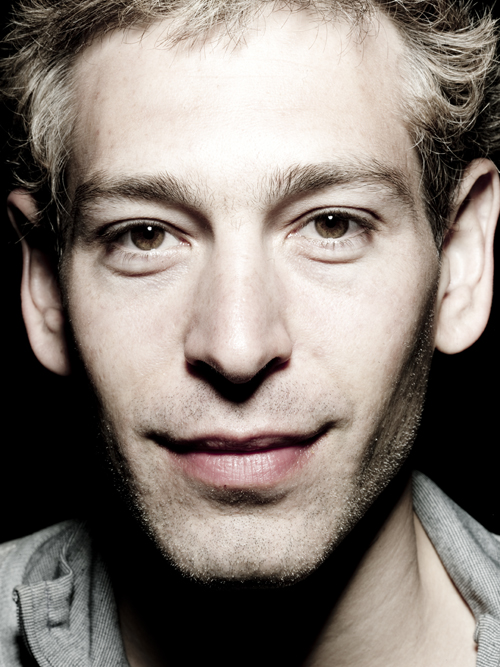
Matisyahu

- June 1
  - TheFatRat, German musician and producer
  - Markus Persson, Swedish video game programmer, designer and creator of Minecraft
  - Rhea Santos, Filipina journalist based in Canada
- June 2
  - Choirul Huda, Indonesian professional footballer and civil servant (d. 2017)
  - Morena Baccarin, Brazilian actress
- June 3 – Pierre Poilievre, Canadian politician
- June 4 – Naohiro Takahara, Japanese football player and coach
- June 5
  - François Sagat, French male gay porn film actor, model and director
  - Pete Wentz, American musician, lyricist and bassist (Fall Out Boy)
- June 6
  - Solenne Figuès, French swimmer
  - Shanda Sharer, American murder victim (d. 1992)
- June 7
  - Anna Torv, Australian actress
  - Kevin Hofland, Dutch footballer
- June 8
  - Pete Orr, Canadian baseball player
  - Eddie Hearn, British promoter
- June 9 – Émilie Loit, French tennis player
- June 10 – Lee Brice, American country music singer-songwriter
- June 12
  - Robyn, Swedish singer-songwriter
  - Amandine Bourgeois, French singer
  - Diego Milito, Argentine football player
- June 13
  - Nila Håkedal, Norwegian beach volleyball player
  - Ágnes Csomor, Hungarian actress
- June 14 – Paradorn Srichaphan, Thai tennis player
- June 15 – Yulia Nestsiarenka, Belarusian athlete
- June 16 – Ari Hest, American singer-songwriter
- June 17
  - Young Maylay, American actor, record producer and rapper
  - Nick Rimando, American soccer player
- June 18
  - Yumiko Kobayashi, Japanese voice actress
  - Chris Neil, Canadian ice hockey player
  - Pini Balili, Israeli-Turkish footballer and manager
  - Ivana Wong, Hong Kong singer-songwriter
- June 19
  - José Kléberson, Brazilian football player and coach
- June 20 - Tika Sumpter, american actress
  - Kate Tsui, Hong Kong actress
- June 21
  - Chris Pratt, American actor
  - Makasini Richter, Tongan rugby league player
- June 22
  - Sandra Klösel, German tennis player
  - Jai Rodriguez, American actor and musician
- June 23
  - Marilyn Agliotti, Dutch field hockey player
  - LaDainian Tomlinson, American football player
- June 24
  - Petra Němcová, Czech model
  - Joaquín de Orbegoso, Peruvian actor
  - Craig Shergold, British cancer patient
  - Mindy Kaling, American actress, comedian and author
- June 25
  - Busy Philipps, American film actress
- June 26
  - Ryan Tedder, American singer (OneRepublic), songwriter and producer
  - Julia Benson, Canadian actress
- June 27
  - Cazwell, American rapper and songwriter
  - Martin Bourboulon, French film director and screenwriter
  - Scott Taylor, American politician
  - Fabrizio Miccoli, Italian professional footballer
- June 28
  - Felicia Day, American actress, writer, director, violinist and singer
  - Randy McMichael, American football player
- June 29
  - Lee Hee-joon, South Korean actor
  - Abz Love, English singer (5ive)
  - Marleen Veldhuis, Dutch swimmer
  - Yehuda Levi, Israeli actor and male model
  - Liliana Castro, Ecuadorian-born Brazilian actress
  - Artur Avila, Brazilian and French mathematician
- June 30
  - Rick Gonzalez, American actor
  - Ed Kavalee, Australian comedian, actor, radio and television host
  - Faisal Shahzad, Pakistani-American bomber
  - Matisyahu, Jewish-American reggae vocalist, beatboxer and alternative rock musician
  - Nelson Lucas, Seychellois sprinter
  - Christopher Jacot, Canadian actor
  - Andy Burrows, English songwriter and musician

=== July ===
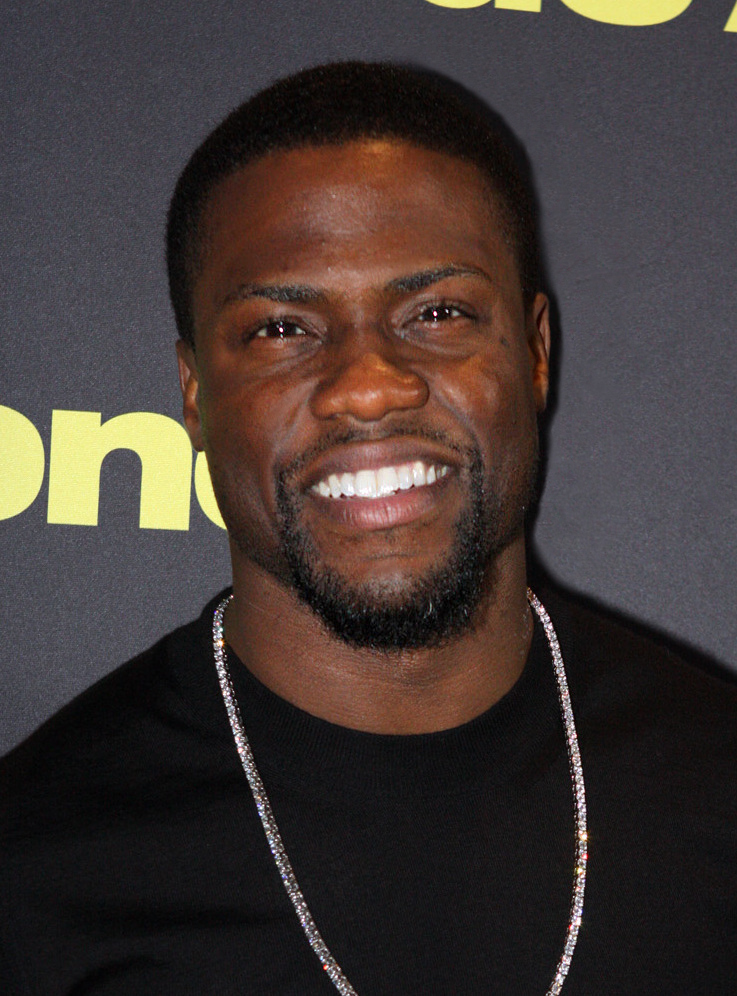
Kevin Hart

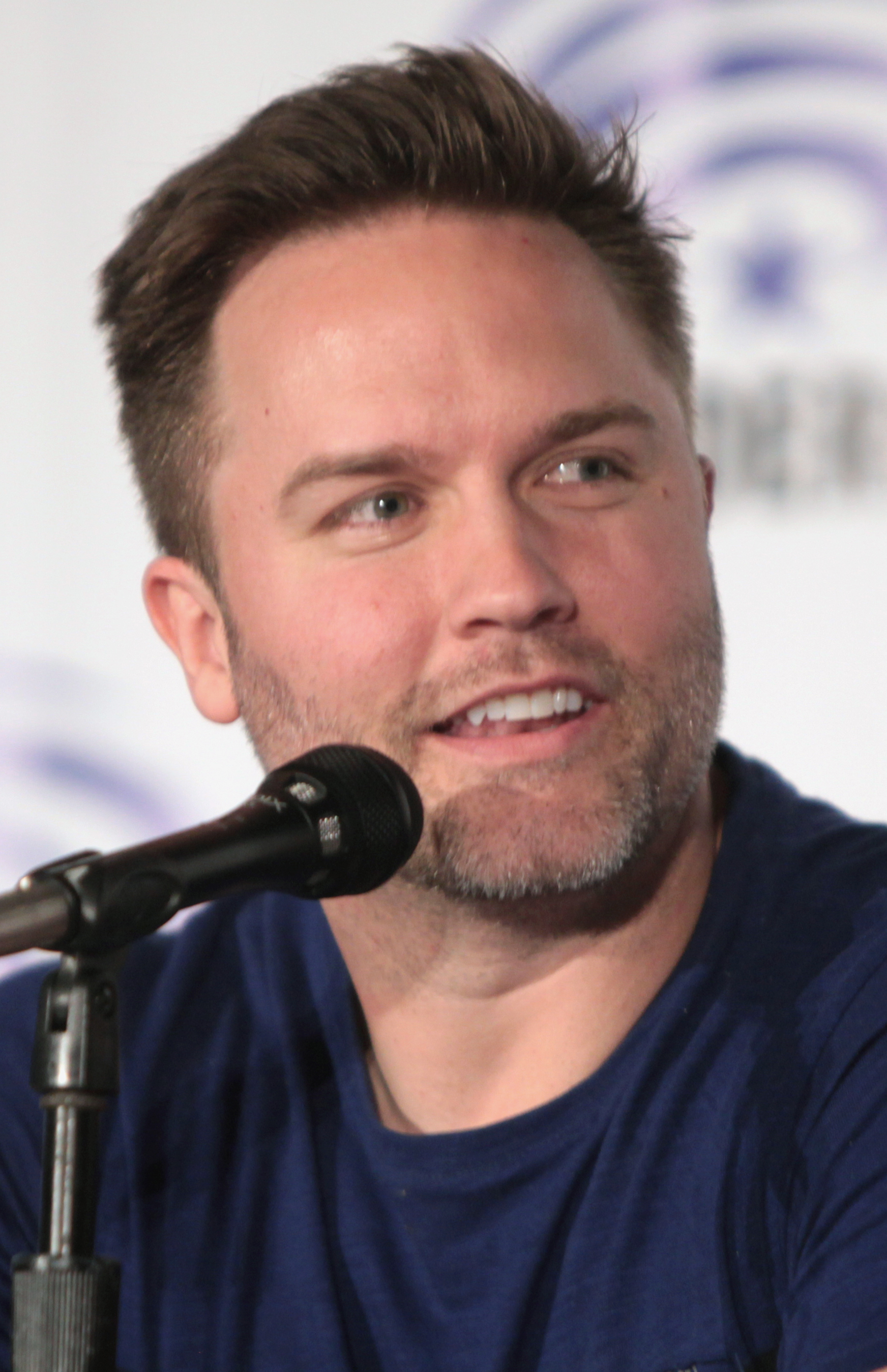
Scott Porter

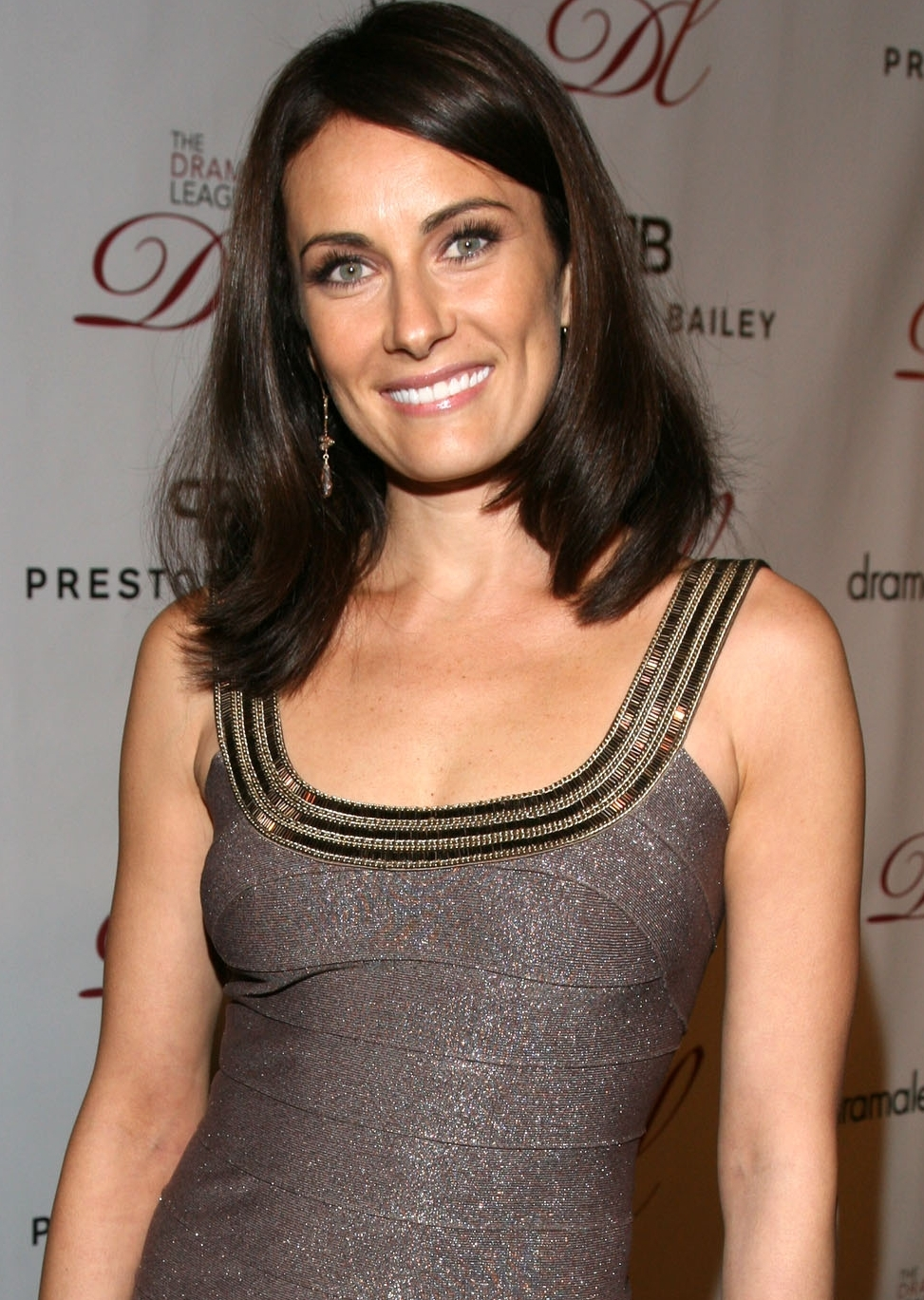
Laura Benanti

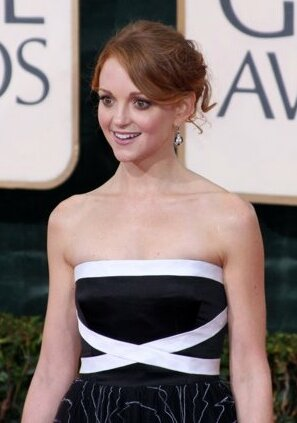
Jayma Mays

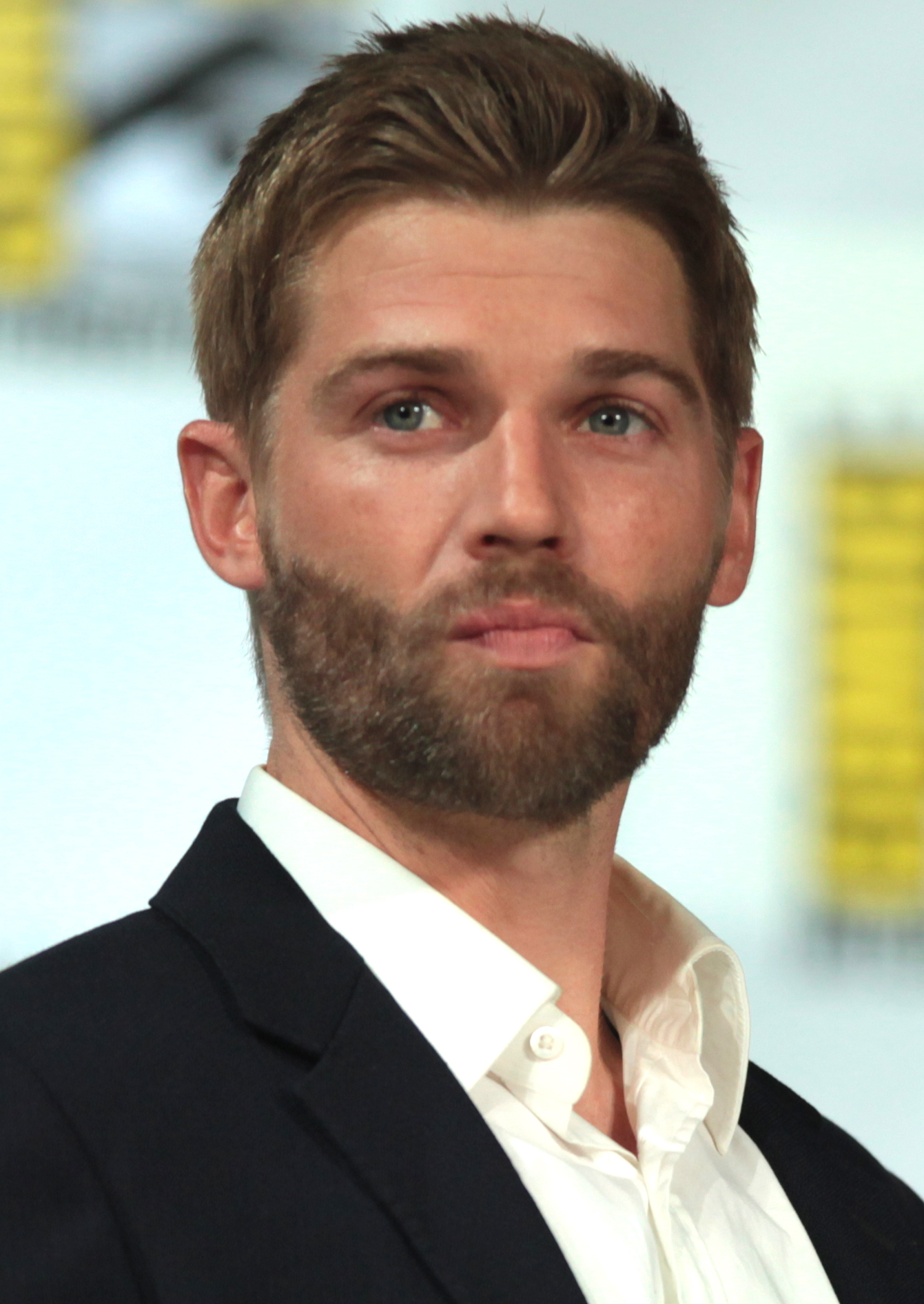
Mike Vogel

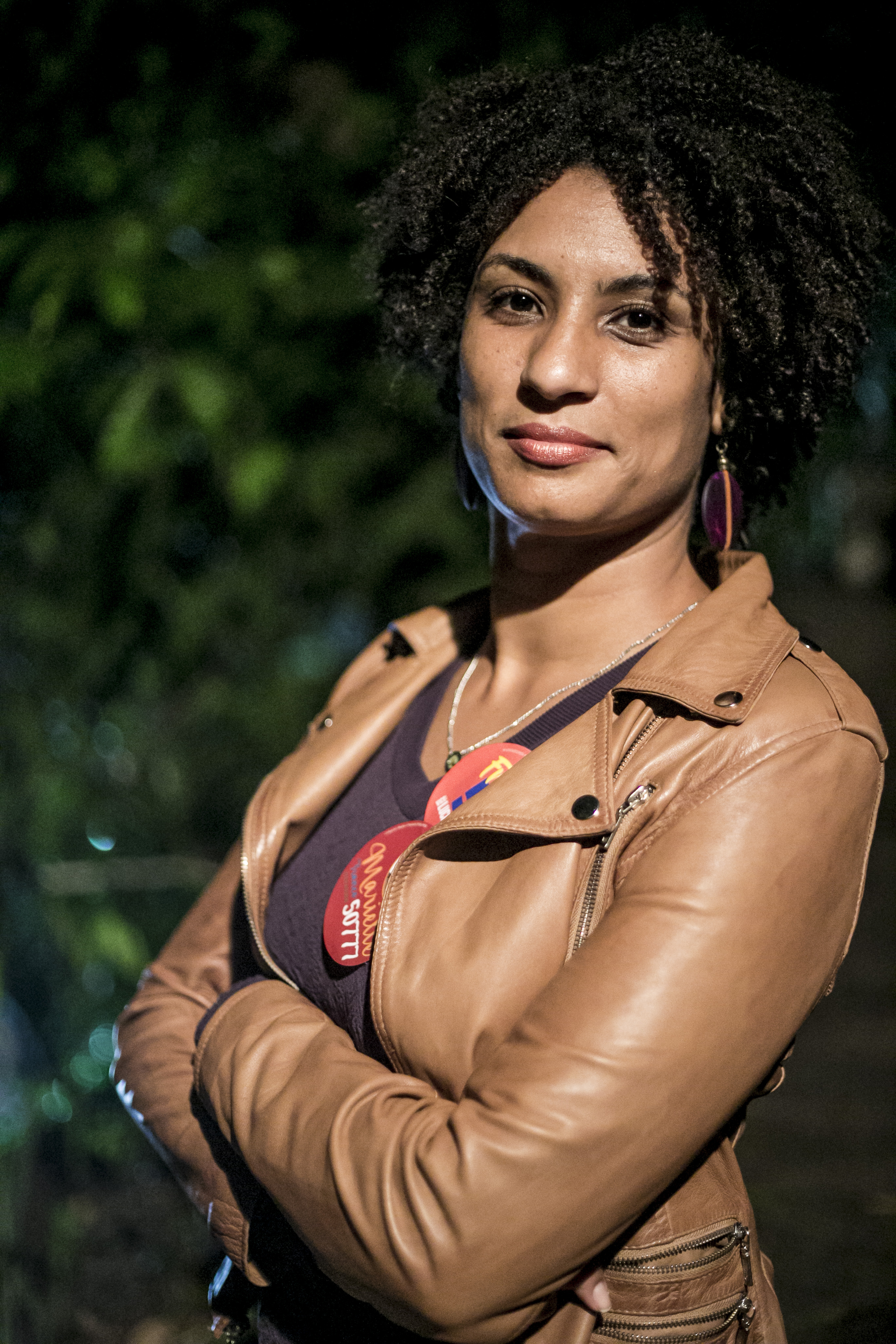
Marielle Franco

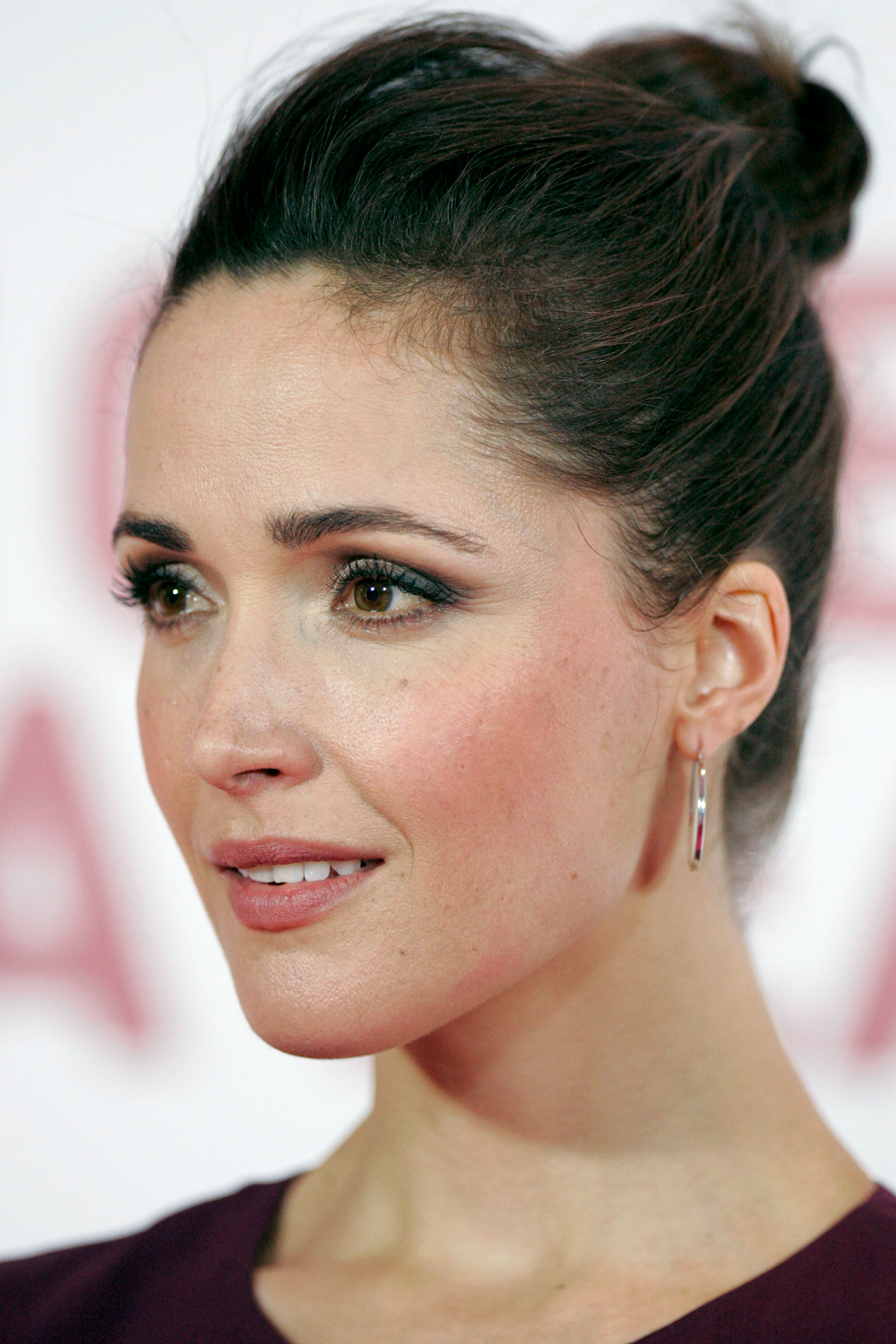
Rose Byrne

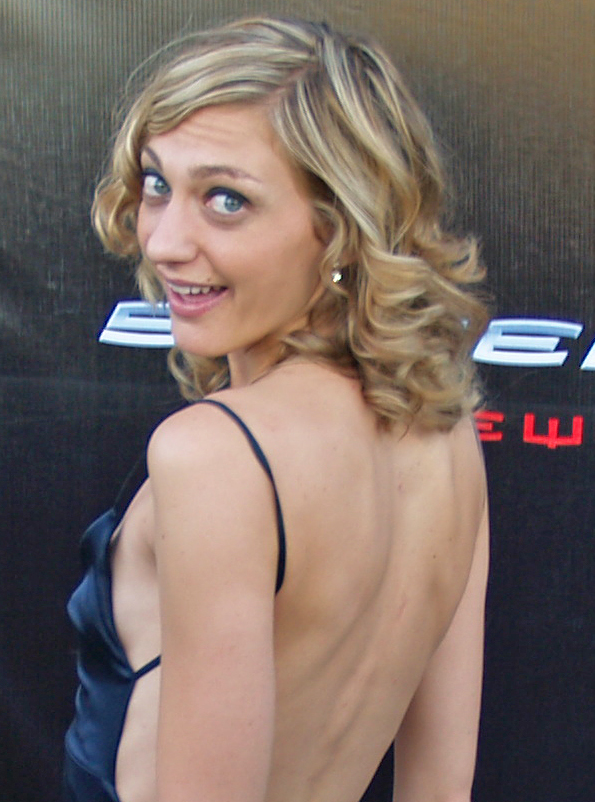
Mageina Tovah

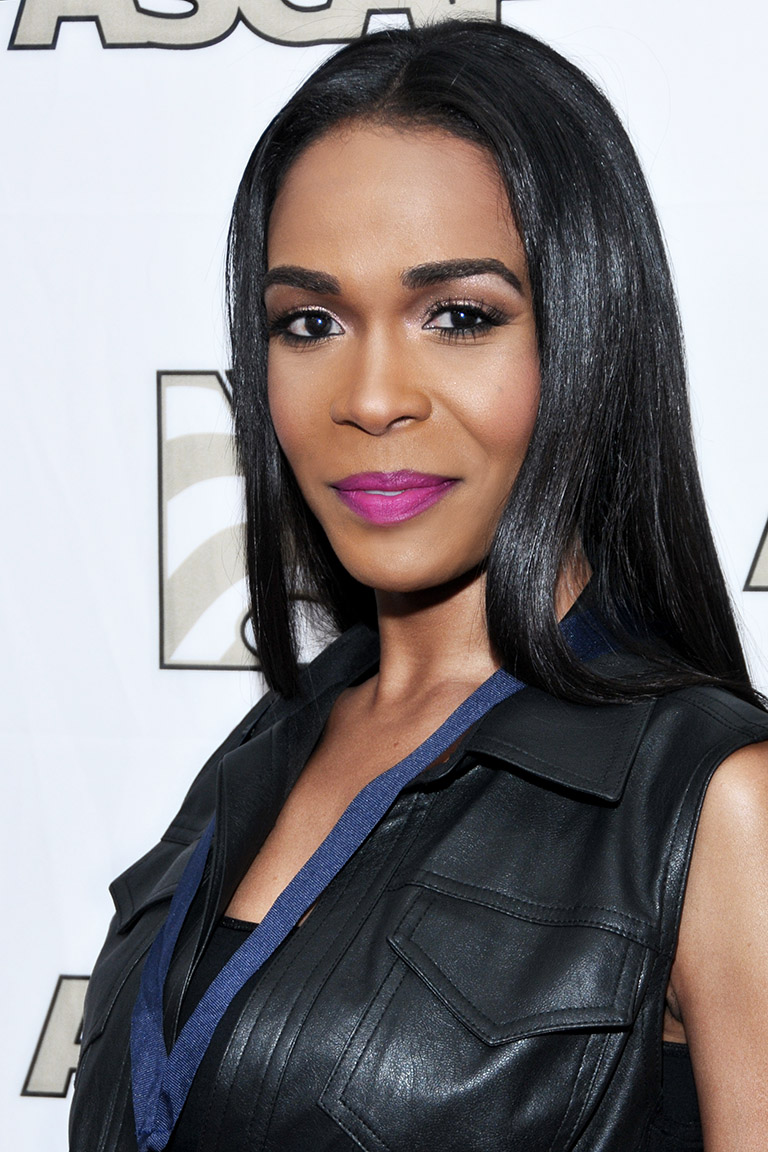
Michelle Williams

- July 1
  - Forrest Griffin, American mixed martial arts fighter
  - Patrik Baboumian, German-Iranian strongman competitor, strength athlete and bodybuilder
- July 2
  - Diana Gurtskaya, Georgian singer
  - Sam Hornish Jr., American race car driver
- July 3
  - Sayuri Katayama, Japanese actress, singer and lyricist
  - Ludivine Sagnier, French model and actress
- July 5
  - Shane Filan, Irish singer (Westlife)
  - Amélie Mauresmo, French tennis player
- July 6
  - Mohsen Bengar, Iranian footballer
  - Kevin Hart, American actor, comedian, writer and producer
- July 7
  - Pat Barry, American kickboxer and mixed martial artist
  - Douglas Hondo, Zimbabwean cricketer
- July 9
  - Gary Chaw, Malaysian Chinese singer
  - Ella Koon, Hong Kong actress
- July 10
  - Mehdi Hasan, British journalist and broadcaster
  - Gong Yoo, South Korean actor
- July 11
  - Marina Gatell, Spanish actress
  - Im Soo-jung, South Korean actress
- July 13
  - Laura Benanti, American actress and singer
  - Ladyhawke, New Zealand singer-songwriter
- July 14
  - Axel Teichmann, German cross-country skier
  - Scott Porter, American actor and singer
- July 15
  - Travis Fimmel, Australian fashion model and actor
  - Alexander Frei, Swiss footballer
- July 16
  - Jim Banks, American politician
  - Kinya Kotani, Japanese singer
  - Kim Rhode, American double trap and skeet shooter
  - Landy Wen, Taiwanese singer
- July 17 – Mike Vogel, American actor
- July 19
  - Malavika, Indian actress
  - David Sakurai, Danish-Japanese actor, director, scriptwriter and martial artist
  - Bruno Cabrerizo, Brazilian football player, model and actor
- July 20
  - Claudine Barretto, Filipino film actress, television actress, entrepreneur and product endorser
  - Marcos Mion, Brazilian TV host, actor, voice actor and businessman
  - Milan Nikolić, Serbian accordionist
  - Adam Rose, South African professional wrestler
  - Amr Shabana, Egyptian squash player
- July 21
  - Tamika Catchings, American basketball player
  - Andriy Voronin, Ukrainian footballer
- July 23 – Michelle Williams, American singer and actress
- July 24 – Rose Byrne, Australian actress
- July 25
  - Juan Pablo Di Pace, Argentinian actor and singer
  - Ali Carter, English snooker player
- July 26
  - Johnson Beharry, British recipient of the Victoria Cross
  - Tamyra Gray, American singer
  - Derek Paravicini, British pianist
  - Yūko Sano, Japanese volleyball player
  - Mageina Tovah, American actress
- July 27
  - Marielle Franco, Brazilian politician (d. 2018)
  - Jorge Arce, Mexican boxer
  - Shannon Moore, American professional wrestler
- July 30
  - Carlos Arroyo, Puerto Rican basketball player
  - Show Lo, Taiwanese singer
  - Graeme McDowell, Northern Irish professional golfer
  - Maya Nasser, Syrian journalist (d. 2012)
- July 31 – B. J. Novak, American actor, director and producer

=== August ===
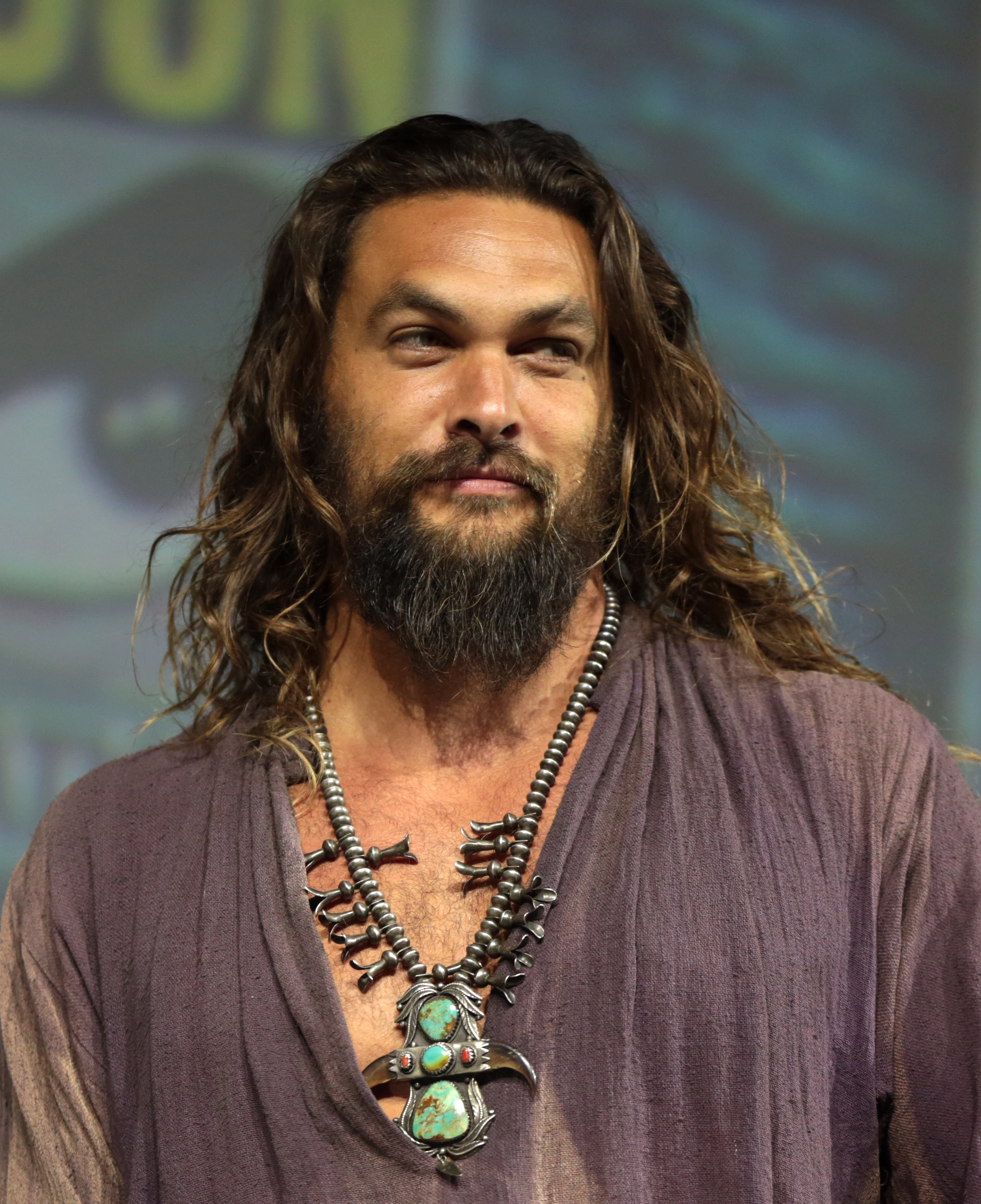
Jason Momoa

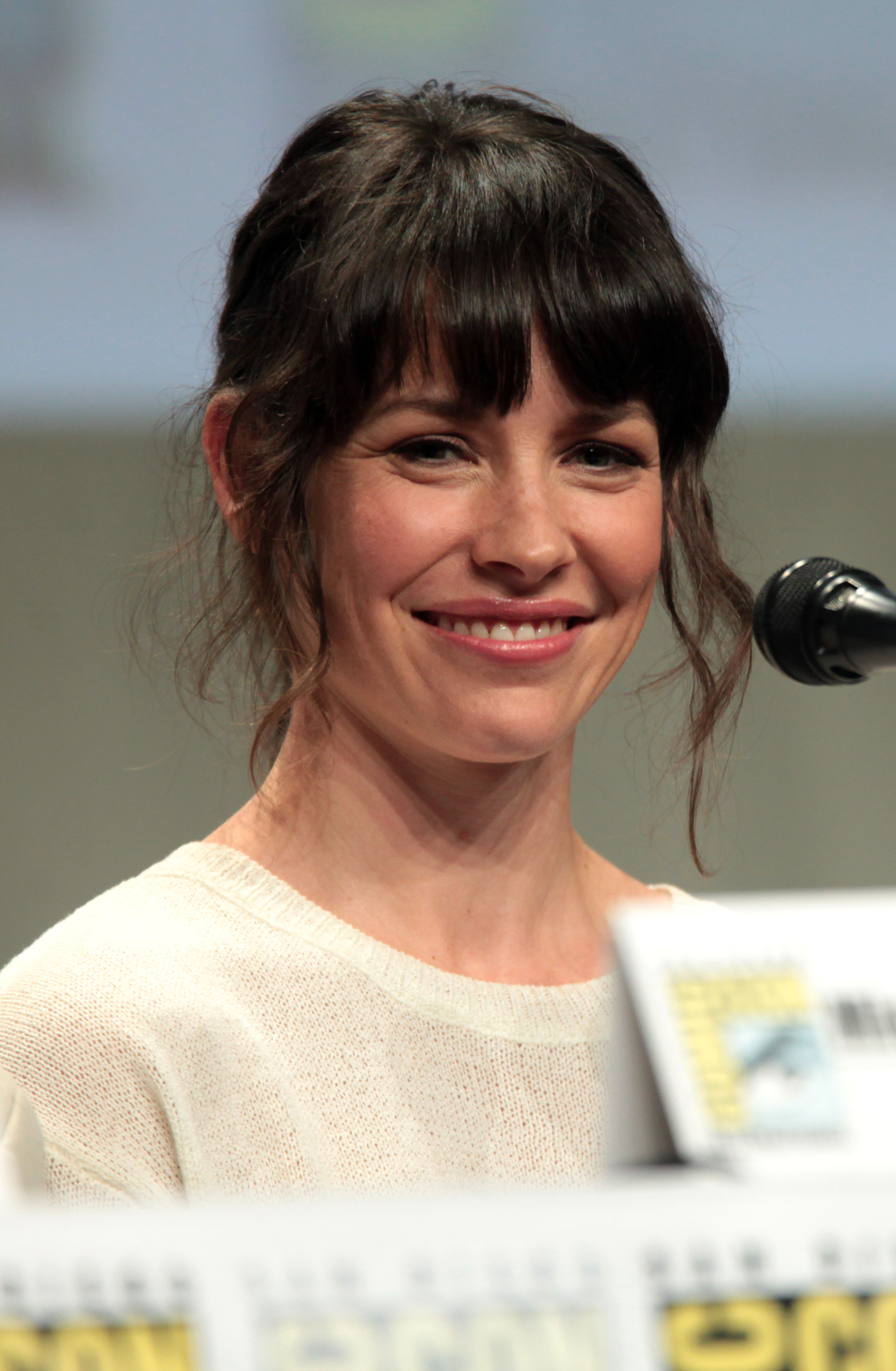
Evangeline Lilly

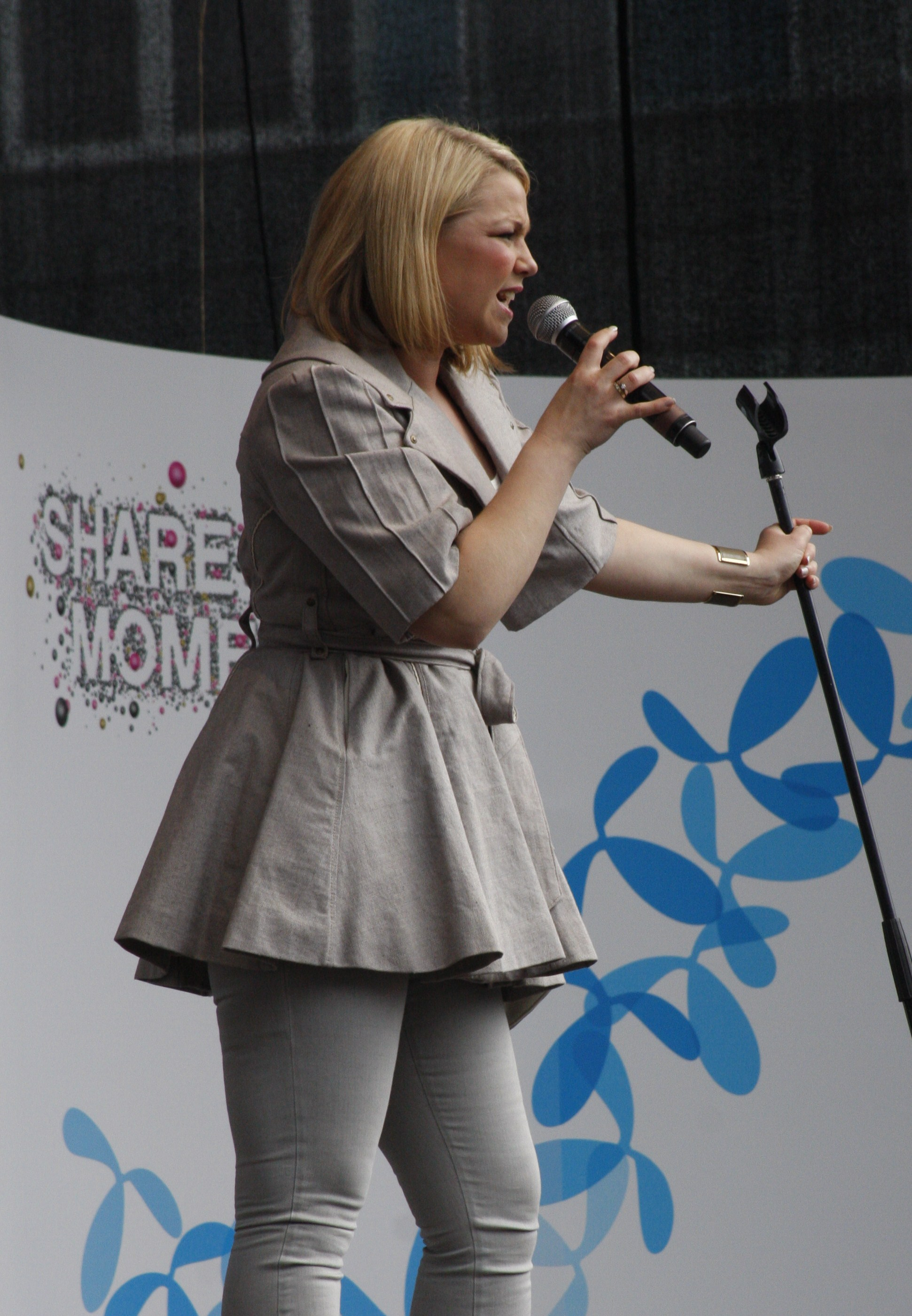
Maria Haukaas Mittet

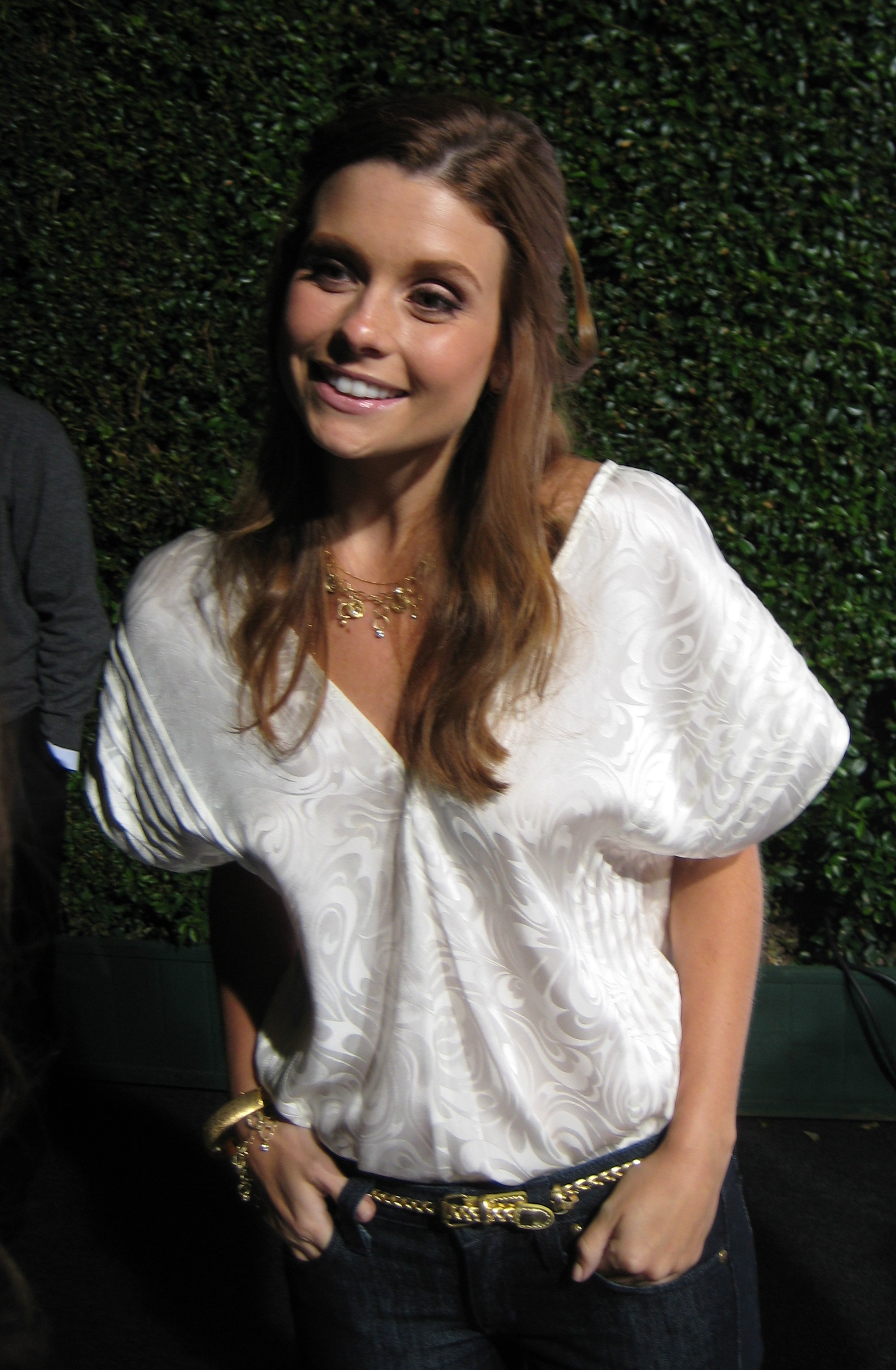
JoAnna Garcia Swisher

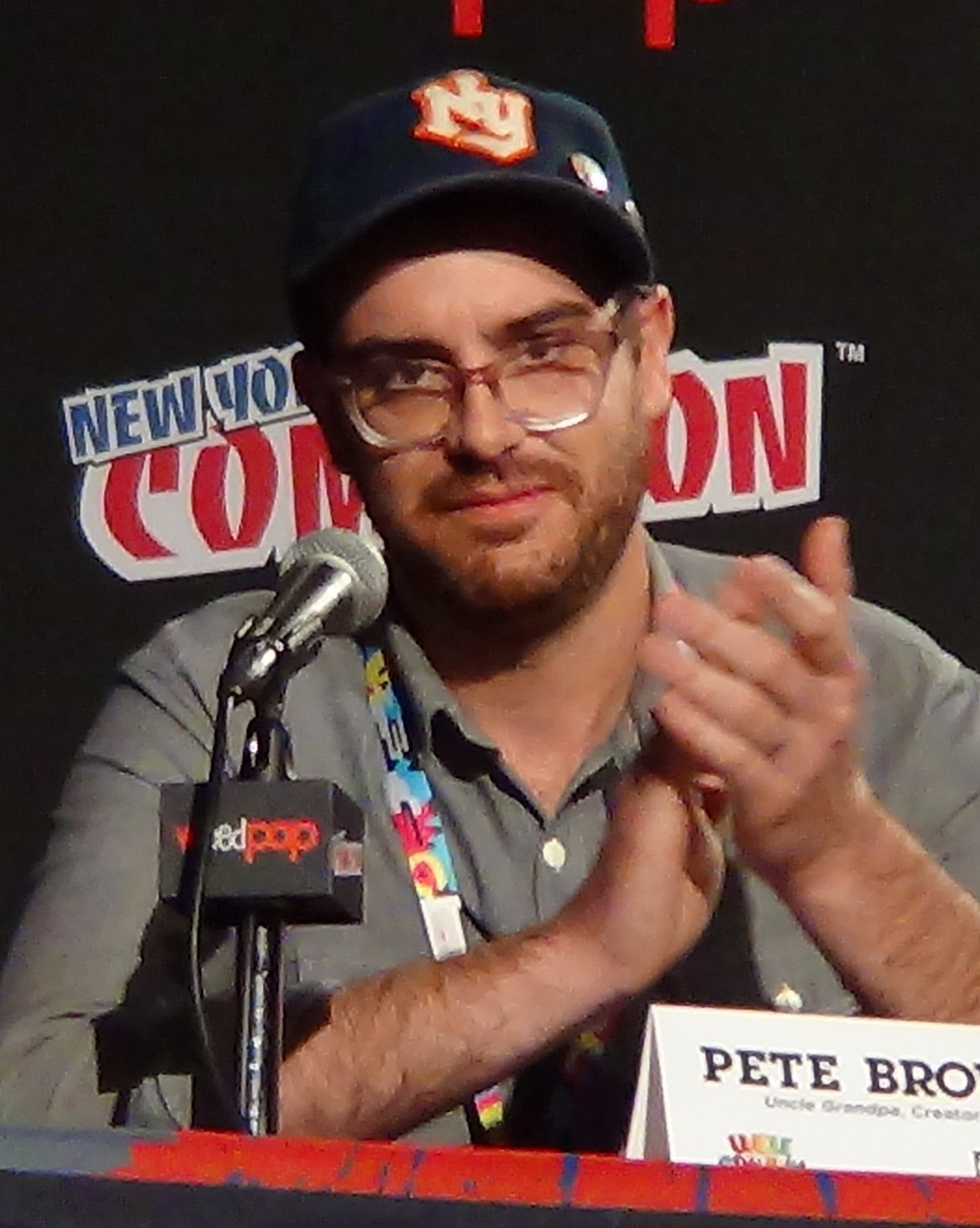
Peter Browngardt

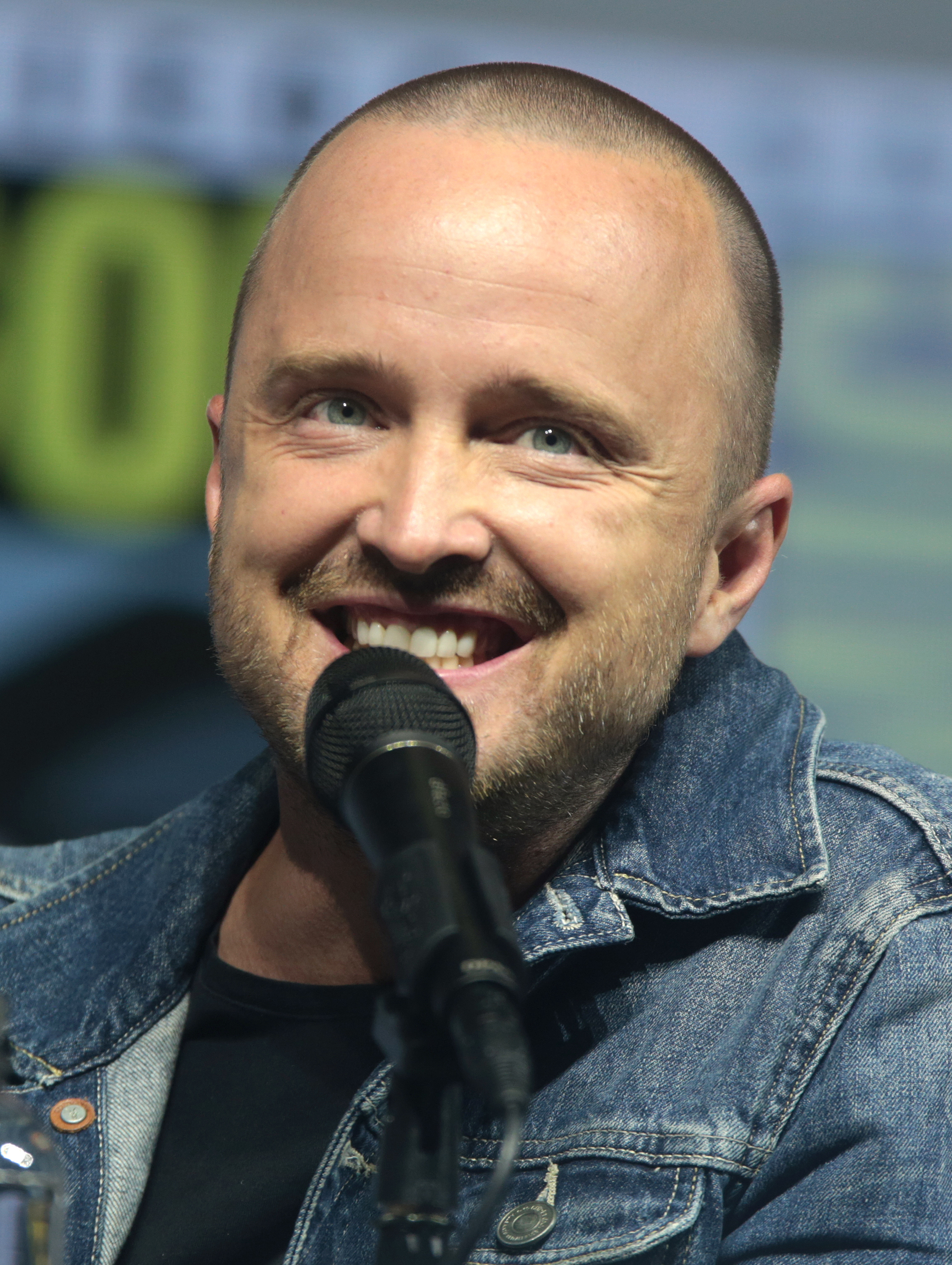
Aaron Paul

- August 1
  - Jason Momoa, American actor
  - Junior Agogo, Ghanaian footballer (d. 2019)
  - Honeysuckle Weeks, British actress
- August 3
  - Evangeline Lilly, Canadian actress and author of children's literature
  - Maria Haukaas Mittet, Norwegian recording artist
- August 4 – Patryk Dominik Sztyber, Polish rock musician
- August 5
  - David Healy, Northern Ireland footballer
  - María Isabel Sánchez Torregrosa, Spanish politician
- August 7
  - Miguel Llera, Spanish footballer
  - Gangsta Boo, American rapper (d. 2023)
- August 10
  - JoAnna Garcia, American actress
  - Ted Geoghegan, American screenwriter
- August 11
  - Drew Nelson, Canadian actor and voice actor
  - Bubba Crosby, American baseball player
- August 12
  - Peter Browngardt, American cartoonist
  - Cindy Klassen, Canadian speed skater
- August 13 – Taizō Sugimura, Japanese politician
- August 15
  - Carl Edwards, American race car driver
  - Peter Shukoff, American comedian, musician and personality
- August 16
  - Sarah Balabagan, Filipina prisoner and singer
- August 19 – Oumar Kondé, Swiss footballer
- August 20 – Jamie Cullum, English jazz pianist and singer
- August 22
  - Matt Walters, American football player
  - Angelu de Leon, Filipina actress
- August 23
  - Mulan Jameela, Indonesian singer and politician
  - Ritchie Neville, English singer (5ive)
- August 24
  - Elva Hsiao, Taiwanese singer
  - Michael Redd, American basketball player
- August 25 – Andrew Hussie, American artist
- August 26
  - Jamal Lewis, American football player
  - Cristian Mora, Ecuadorian footballer
  - Erik Valdez, American actor
- August 27
  - Giovanni Capitello, American filmmaker and actor
  - Tian Liang, Chinese diver
  - Aaron Paul, American actor
- August 28
  - Robert Hoyzer, German football referee
  - Yuki Maeda, Japanese singer
  - Shane Van Dyke, American actor
- August 29 – Justine Pasek, Miss Universe 2002
- August 30
  - Leon Lopez, British actor, film director, singer-songwriter and occasional model
  - Tavia Yeung, Hong Kong actress
  - Niki Chow, Hong Kong actress
- August 31
  - Mickie James, American professional wrestler
  - Simon Neil, Scottish musician (vocalist, guitarist, songwriter), Biffy Clyro Marmaduke Duke
  - Yuvan Shankar Raja, Indian film composer

=== September ===
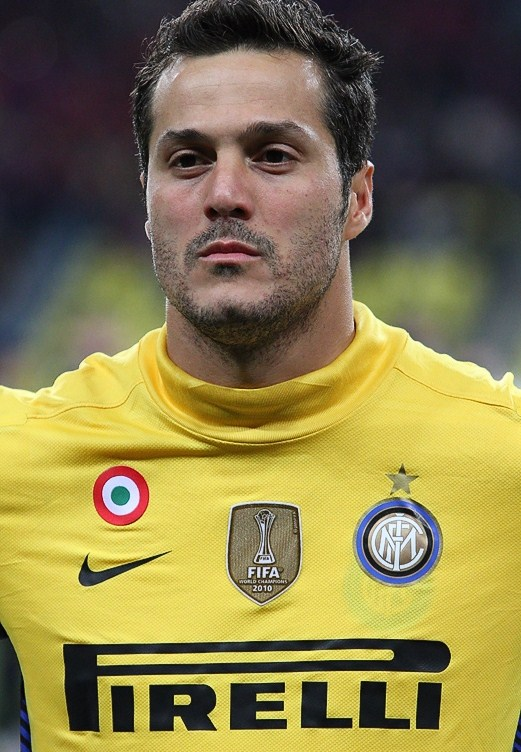
Júlio César

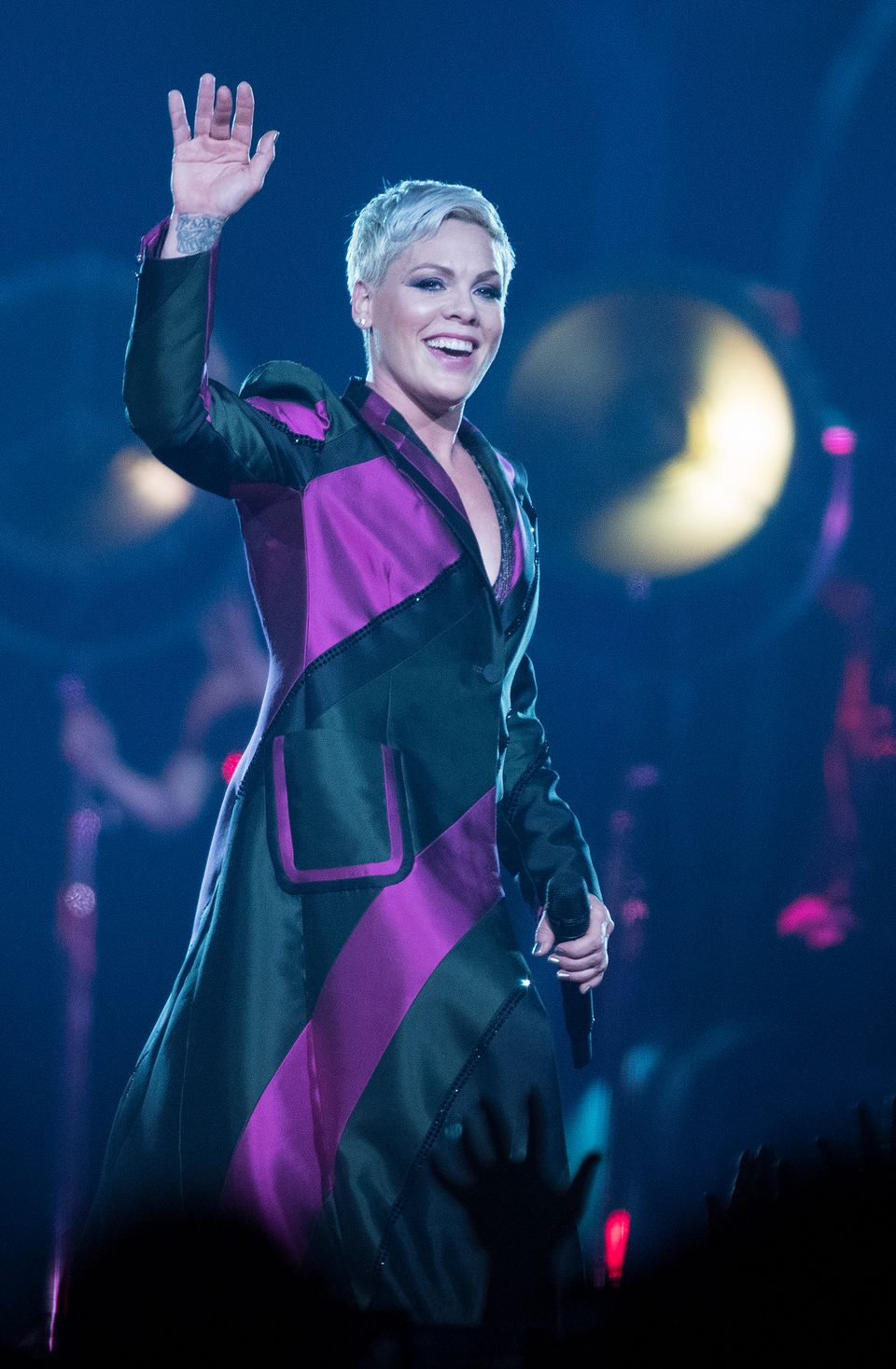
Pink

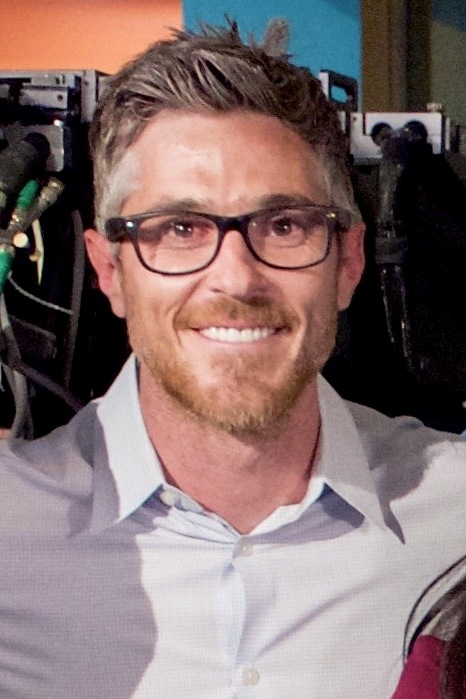
Dave Annable

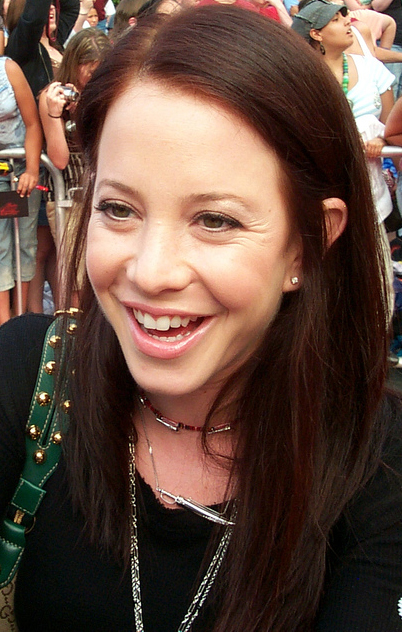
Amy Davidson

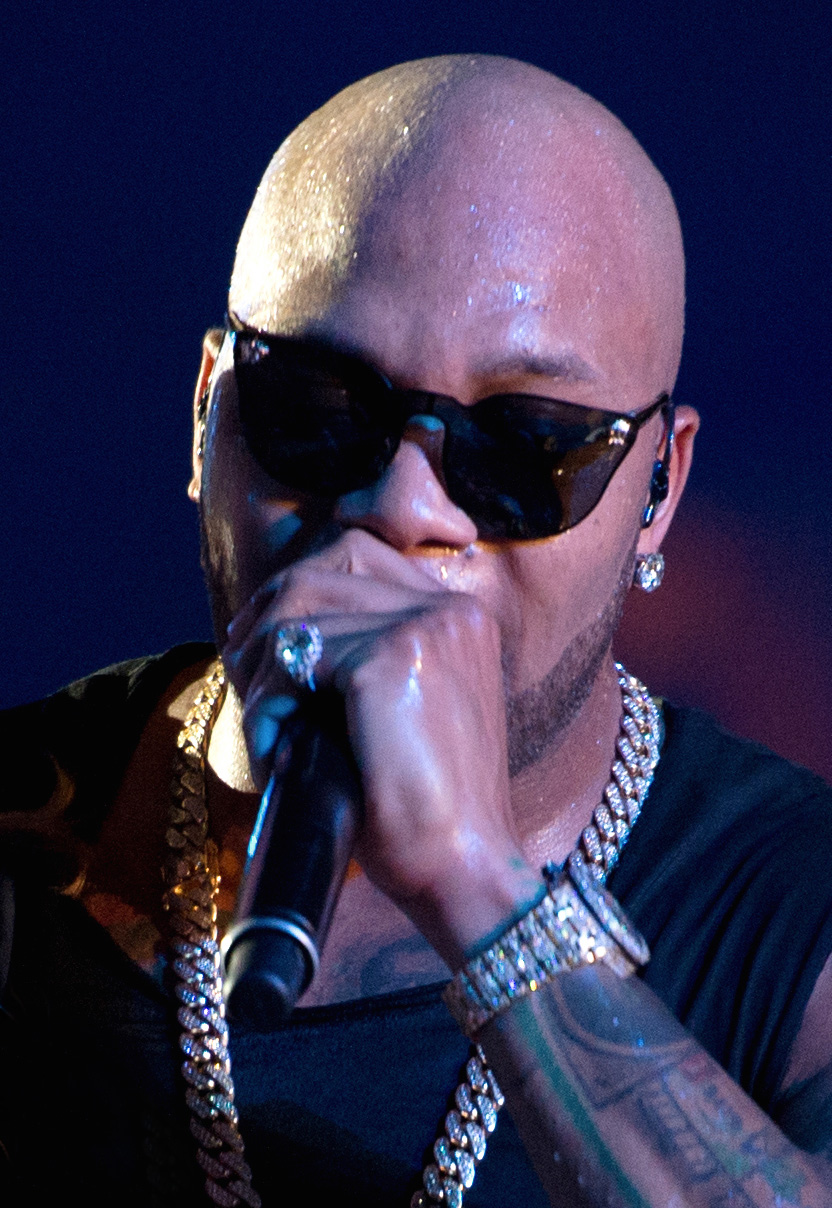
Flo Rida

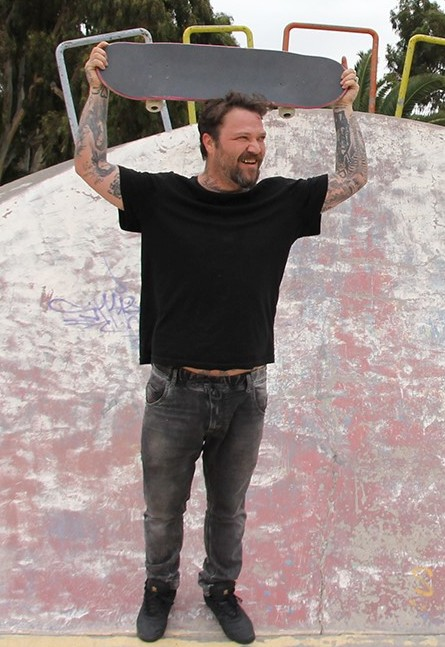
Bam Margera

- September 1
  - Neg Dupree, British comedian
  - Margherita Granbassi, Italian fencer
- September 2
  - Ron Ng, Hong Kong actor
  - Łukasz Żygadło, Polish volleyball player
- September 3 – Júlio César, Brazilian football goalkeeper
- September 4 – Maxim Afinogenov, Russian ice hockey player
- September 5
  - John Carew, Norwegian footballer
  - Stacey Dales, Canadian basketball player and sportscaster
- September 7 – Nathan Hindmarsh, Australian rugby league player
- September 8 – Pink, American singer and actress
- September 10
  - Mustis, Norwegian pianist
  - Laia Palau, Spanish basketball player
- September 11
  - Eric Abidal, French footballer
  - Cameron Richardson, American actress and model
  - David Pizarro, Chilean footballer
- September 12
  - Michelle Dorrance, American tap dancer
  - Jay McGraw, American author, son of TV psychologist Dr. Phil McGraw
- September 13 – Ivan Miljković, Serbian volleyball player
- September 14
  - Chris John, Indonesian former featherweight boxing champion
  - Ivica Olić, Croatian footballer
- September 15
  - Dave Annable, American actor
  - Amy Davidson, American actress
  - Edna Ngeringway Kiplagat, Kenyan long-distance runner
  - Patrick Marleau, Canadian ice hockey player
- September 16
  - Fanny, French singer
  - Flo Rida, African-American rapper
  - Soo Ae, South Korean actress
- September 17
  - Akin Ayodele, American football player
  - Chuck Comeau, Canadian drummer
- September 18
  - Junichi Inamoto, Japanese footballer
  - Alison Lohman, American actress
- September 19 – Noémie Lenoir, French supermodel
- September 20
  - Lars Jacobsen, Danish footballer
  - Aurélie Trouvé, French politician
- September 21 – Chris Gayle, Jamaican cricketer
- September 22
  - Peggy Flanagan, American politician, Senator-elect of Minnesota
  - MyAnna Buring, Swedish-English actress
- September 23 – Lote Tuqiri, Fijian-Australian rugby player
- September 24
  - Justin Bruening, American actor and model
  - Erin Chambers, American actress
  - Julia Clarete, Filipina actress
- September 25
  - Rashad Evans, American retired mixed martial artist
  - Michele Scarponi, Italian road bicycle racer (d. 2017)
- September 26
  - Naomichi Marufuji, Japanese professional wrestler
  - Taavi Rõivas, Prime Minister of Estonia
- September 27
  - Zoltán Horváth, Hungarian basketball player (d. 2009)
  - Shinji Ono, Japanese football player
  - Nathan Foley, Australian performer
- September 28
  - Bam Margera, American skateboarder
  - Anndi McAfee, American actress and voice actress
- September 29
  - Gaitana, Ukrainian singer and songwriter of Ukrainian and Congolese descent
  - Artika Sari Devi, Putri Indonesia 2004
- September 30
  - Mike Damus, American actor
  - Vince Chong, Malaysian singer
  - Juho Kuosmanen, Finnish film director and screenwriter

=== October ===
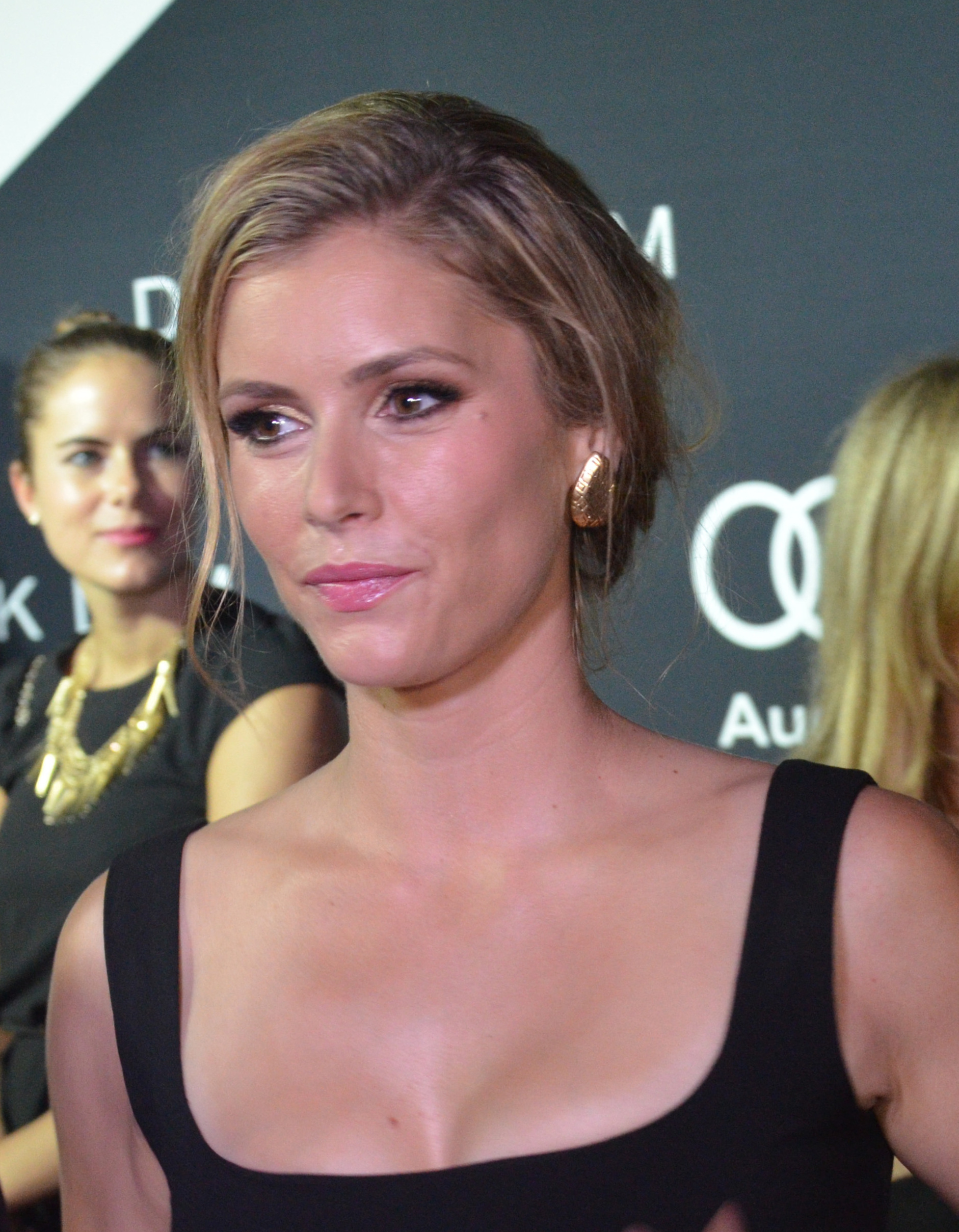
Brianna Brown

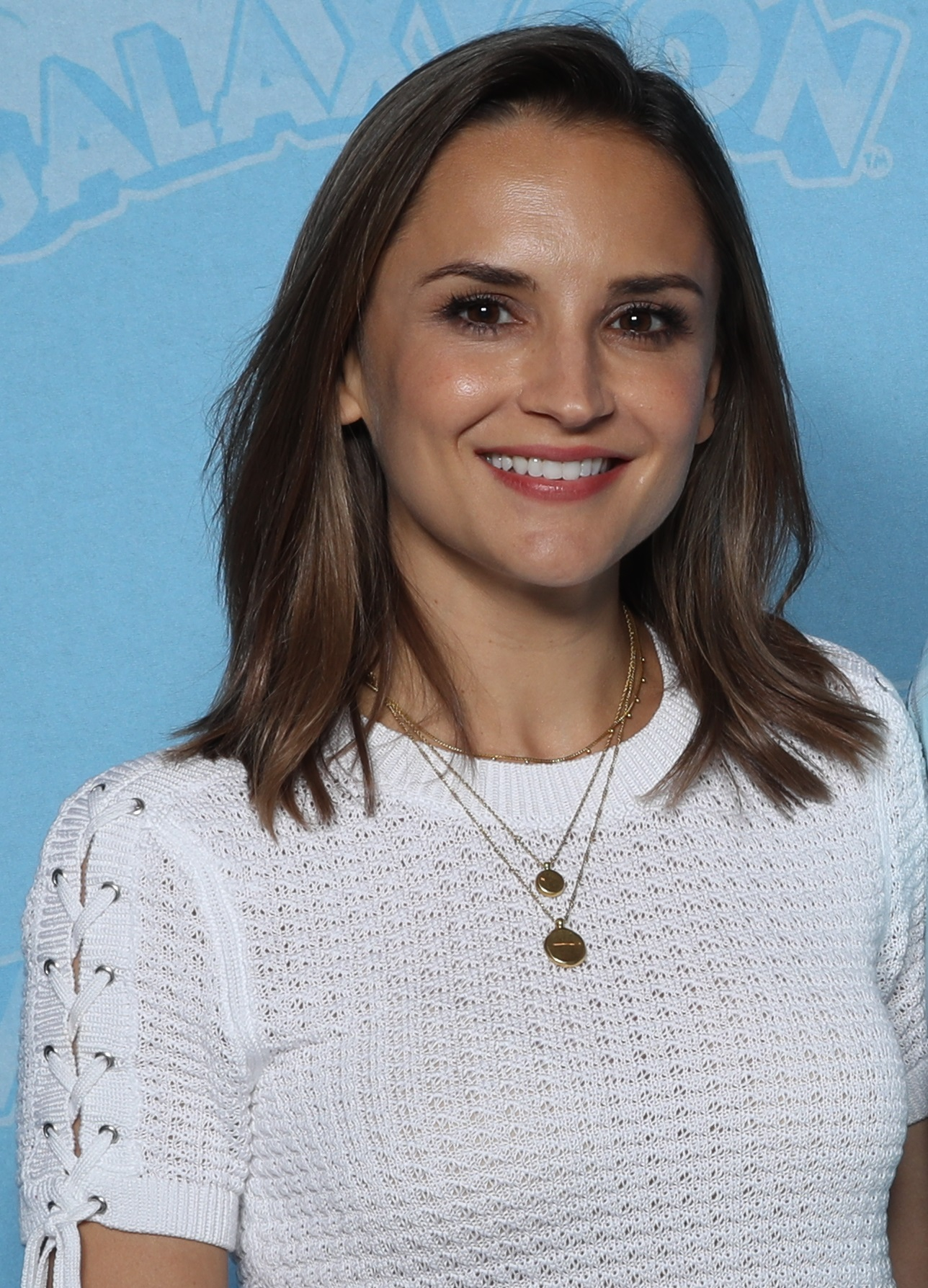
Rachael Leigh Cook

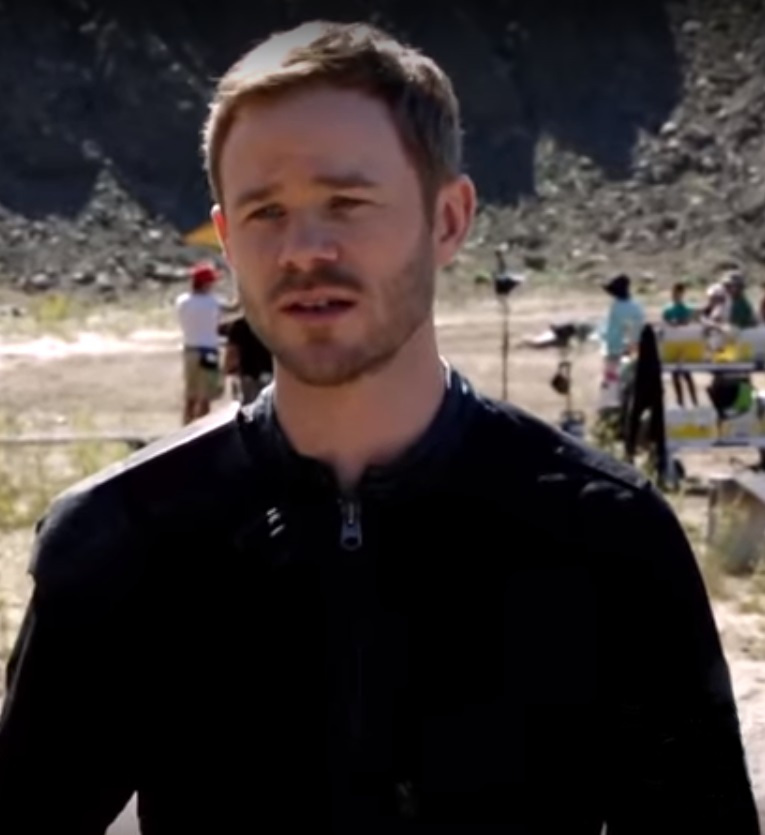
Aaron Ashmore

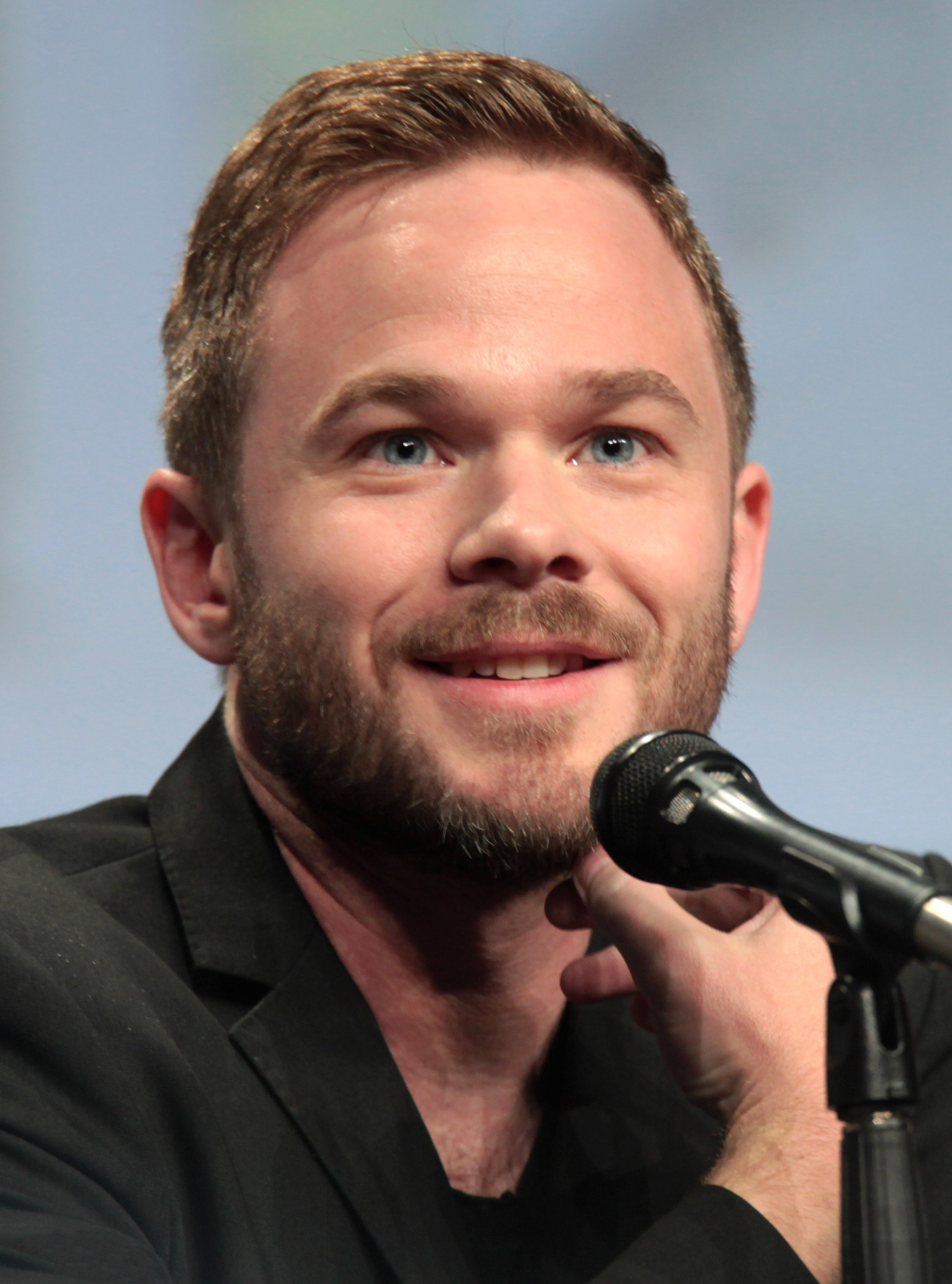
Shawn Ashmore

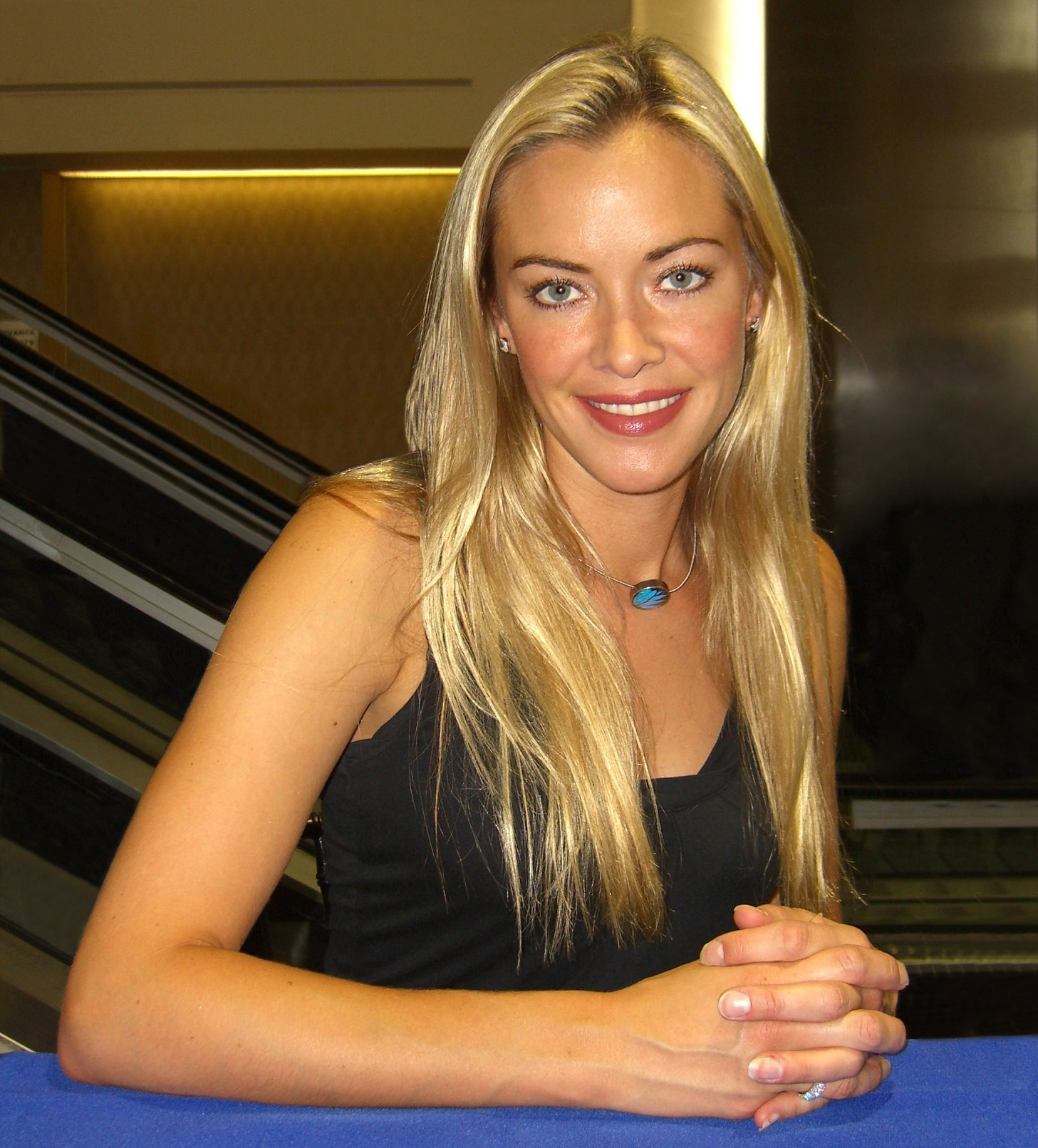
Kristanna Loken

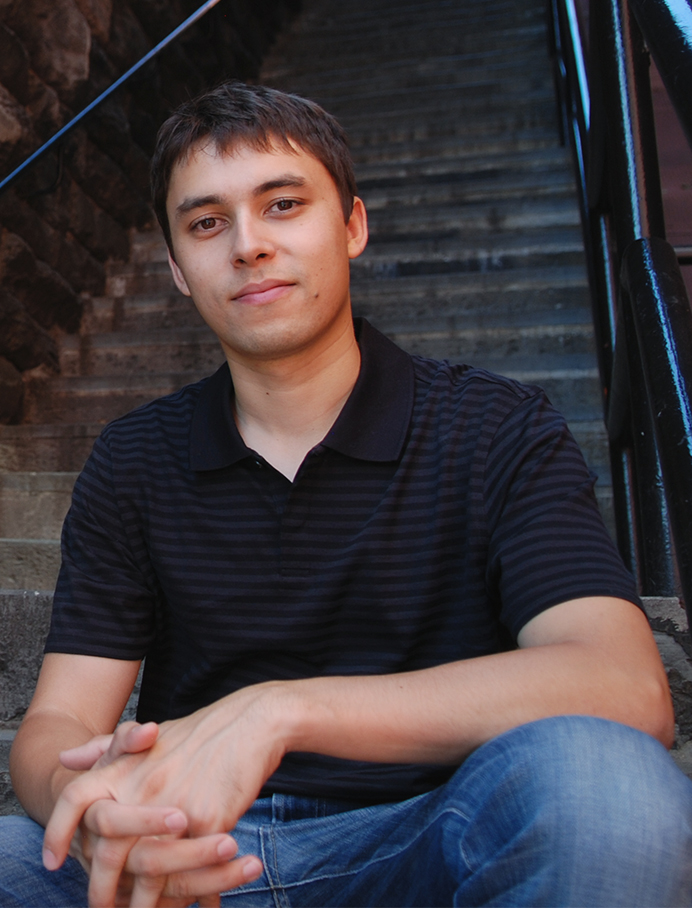
Jawed Karim

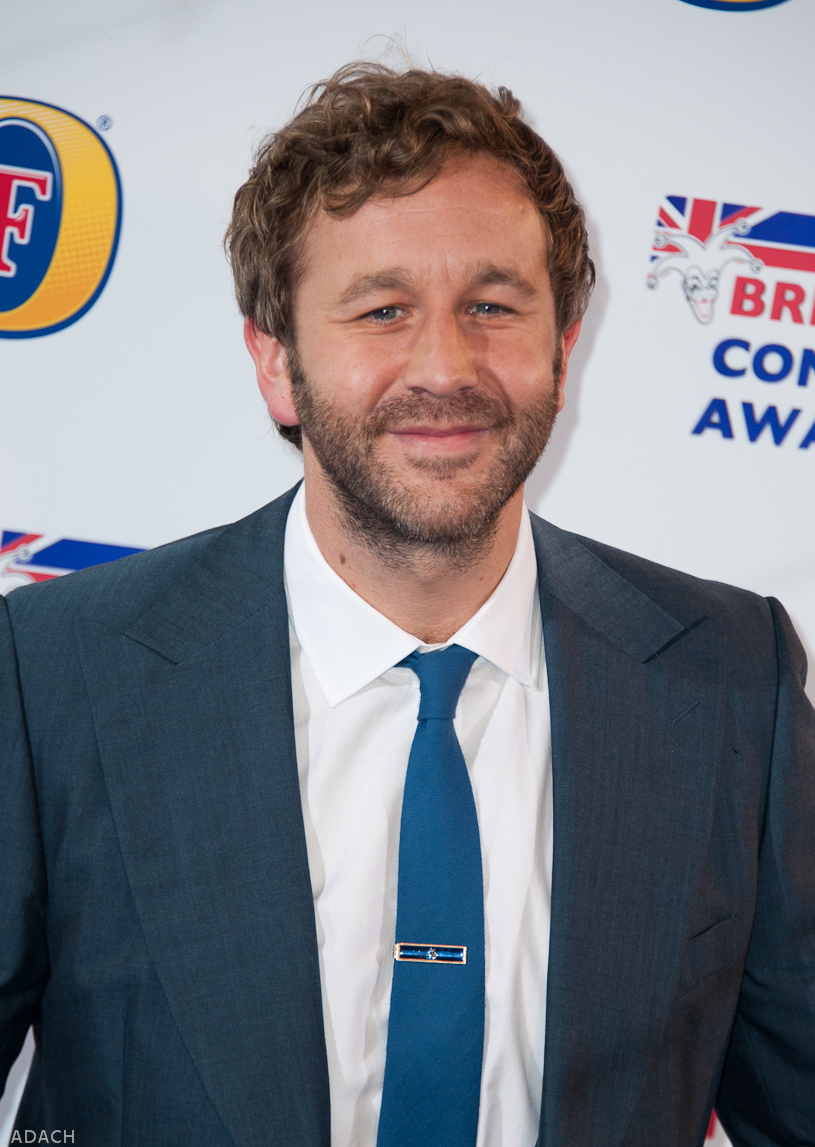
Chris O'Dowd

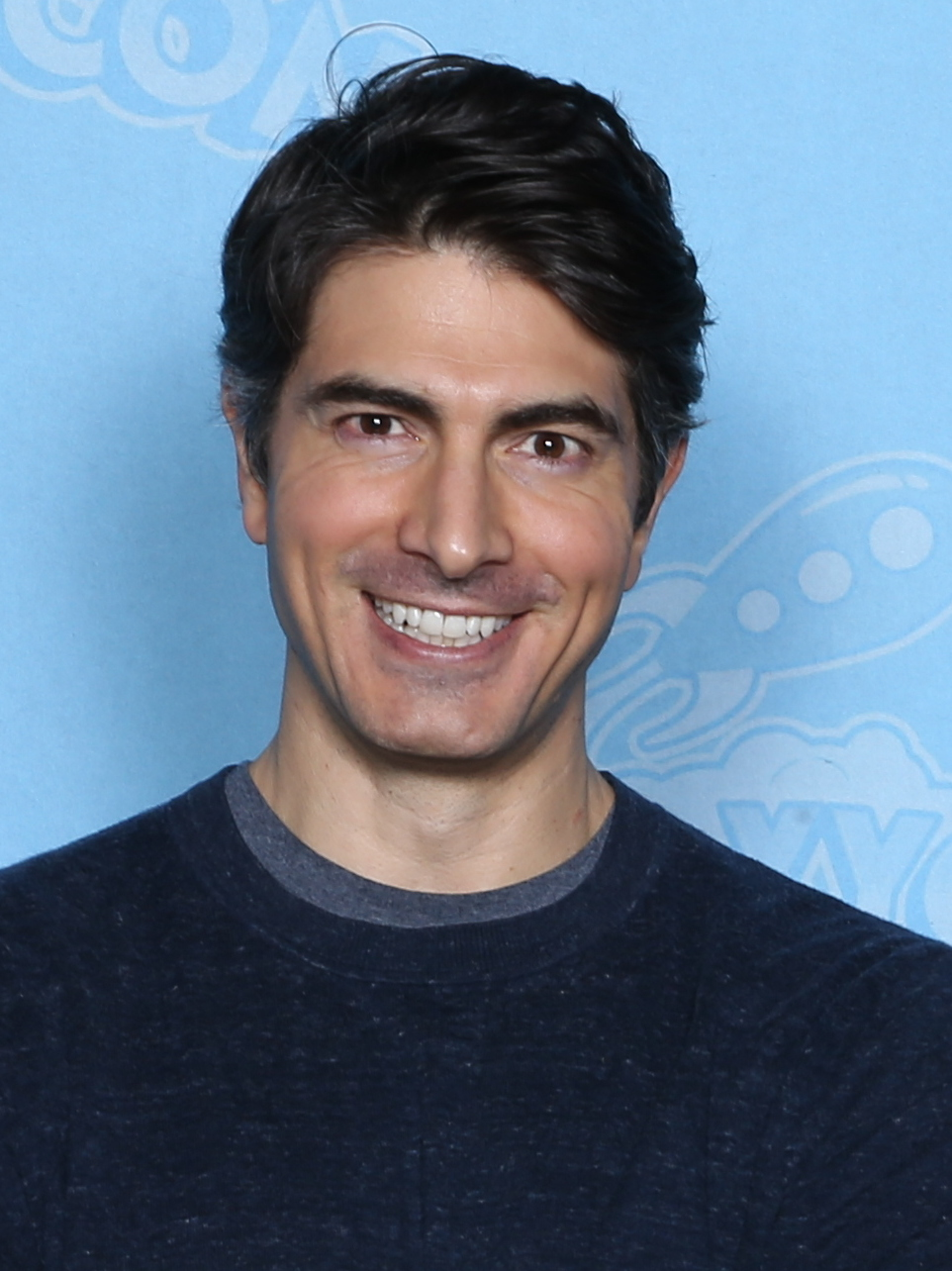
Brandon Routh

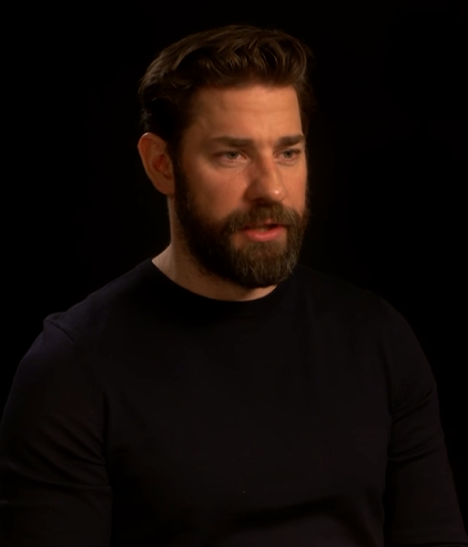
John Krasinski

- October 1
  - Rudi Johnson, American football player
  - Senit, Italian singer of Eritrean descent
  - Marko Stanojevic, English-born Italian rugby union player
- October 2 – Brianna Brown, American actress
- October 3
  - Josh Klinghoffer, American musician (Red Hot Chili Peppers)
  - John Morrison, American professional wrestler
- October 4
  - Caitriona Balfe, Irish model and actress
  - Rachael Leigh Cook, American actress
  - Adam Voges, Australian cricketer
- October 5 – Gao Yuanyuan, Chinese actress
- October 6 – Mohamed Kallon, Sierra Leonean football player and coach
- October 7
  - Aaron Ashmore, Canadian film and television actor
  - Shawn Ashmore, Canadian film and television actor
  - Simona Amânar, Romanian gymnast
  - Tang Wei, Chinese actress
- October 8 – Kristanna Loken, American actress and model
- October 9
  - Csézy, Hungarian singer
  - Chris O'Dowd, Irish actor and comedian
  - Brandon Routh, American actor
  - Gonzalo Sorondo, Uruguayan footballer
- October 10
  - Wu Chun, Bruneian actor, model and singer
  - Nicolás Massú, Chilean tennis player
  - Mýa, American singer and actress
- October 11
  - Bae Doona, South Korean actress
  - Gabe Saporta, Uruguayan singer (Cobra Starship)
- October 13
  - Wes Brown, English footballer
  - Esmah Lahlah, Dutch politician
  - Mamadou Niang, Senegalese footballer
- October 14 – Stacy Keibler, American actress and model
- October 15 – Jaci Velasquez, American Christian singer
- October 17 – Kimi Räikkönen, Finnish 2007 Formula 1 world champion
- October 18 – Ne-Yo, African-American singer and songwriter
- October 20
  - John Krasinski, American actor
  - Paul O'Connell, Irish rugby union player
  - Anna Boden, American filmmaker
- October 23
  - Jorge Solís, Mexican professional boxer
  - Prabhas, Indian actor
- October 25 – Sarah Thompson, American actress
- October 28
  - Glover Teixeira, Brazilian-American mixed martial artist
  - Jawed Karim, German and Bangladeshi-American software engineer, Internet entrepreneur and co-founder of YouTube
  - Martin Škoula, Czech ice hockey player
- October 30
  - Geert Gabriëls, Dutch politician
  - Yukie Nakama, Japanese actress

=== November ===
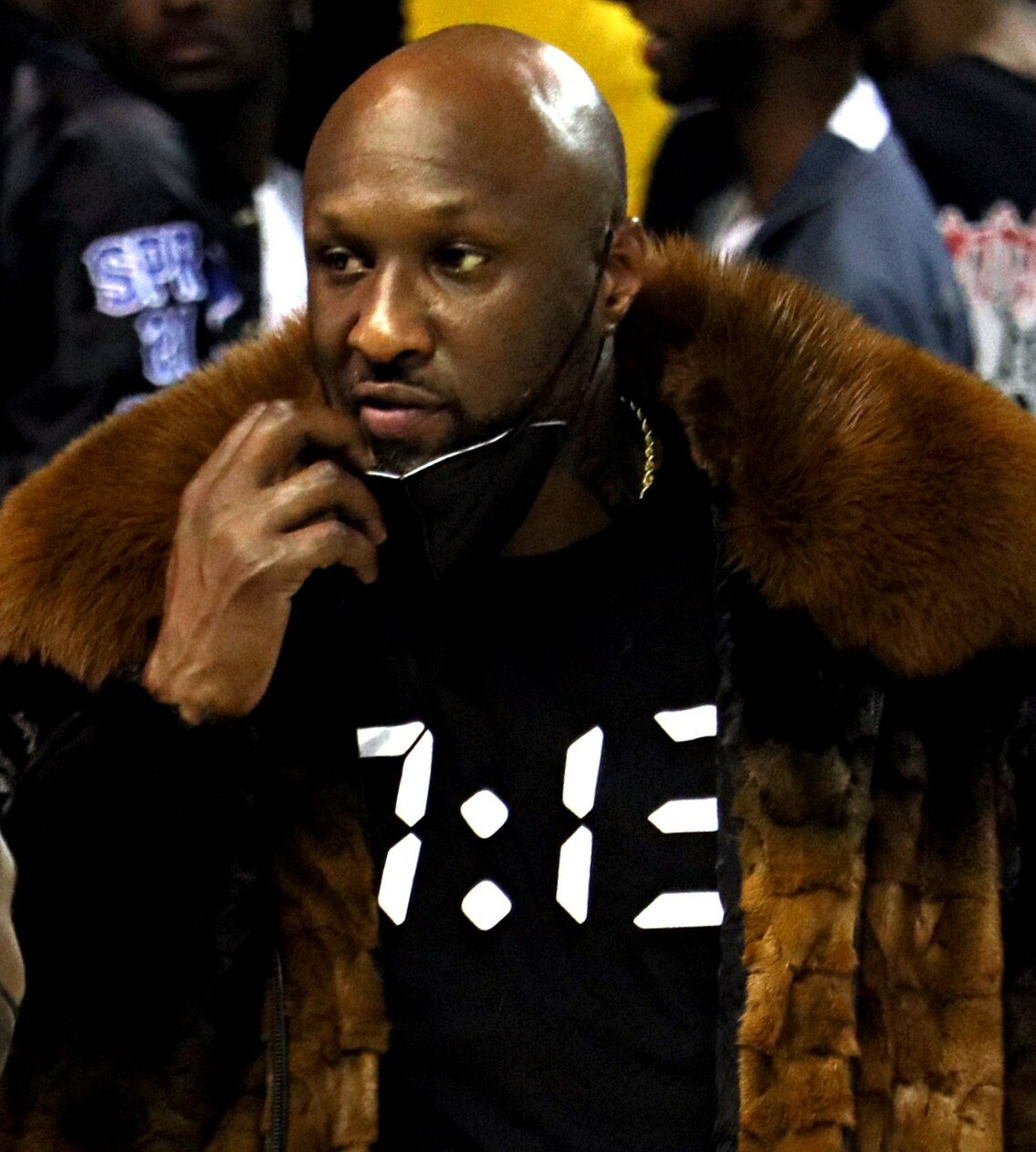
Lamar Odom

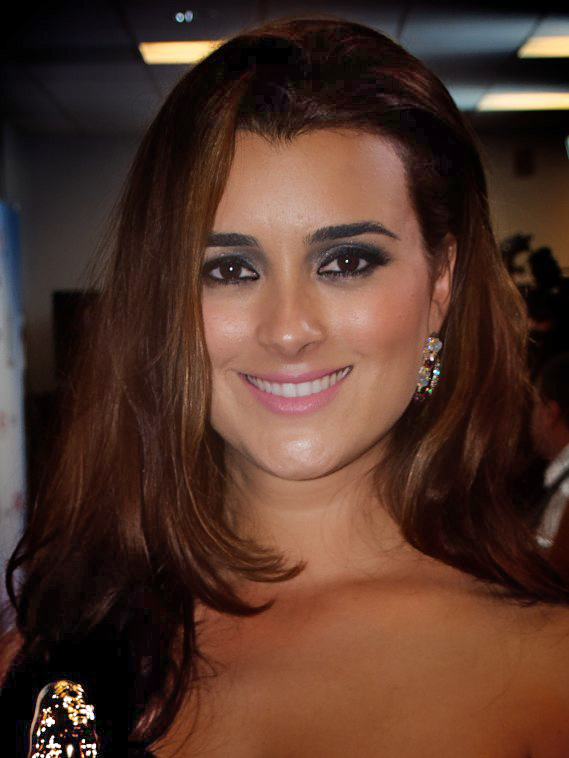
Cote de Pablo

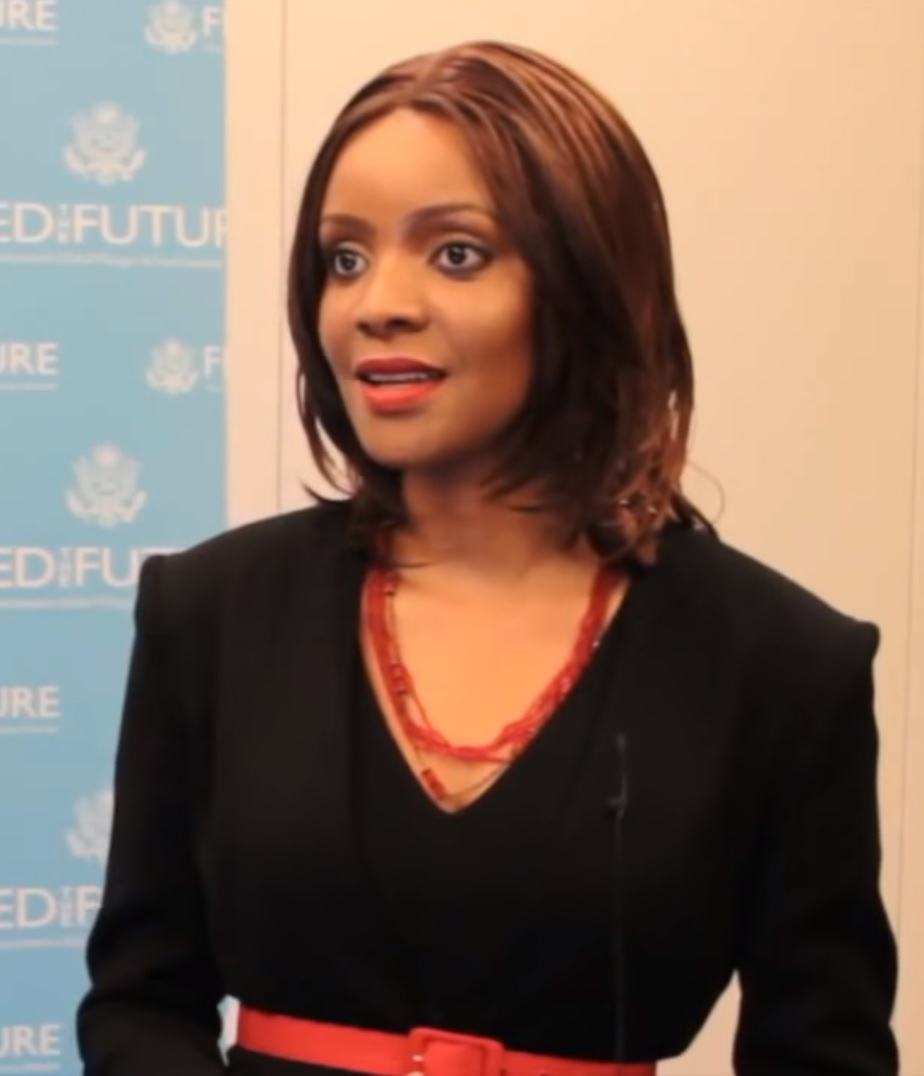
Mpule Kwelagobe

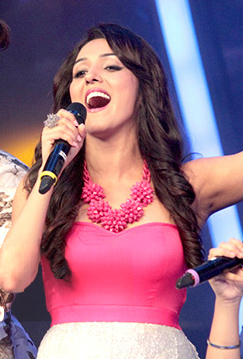
Neeti Mohan

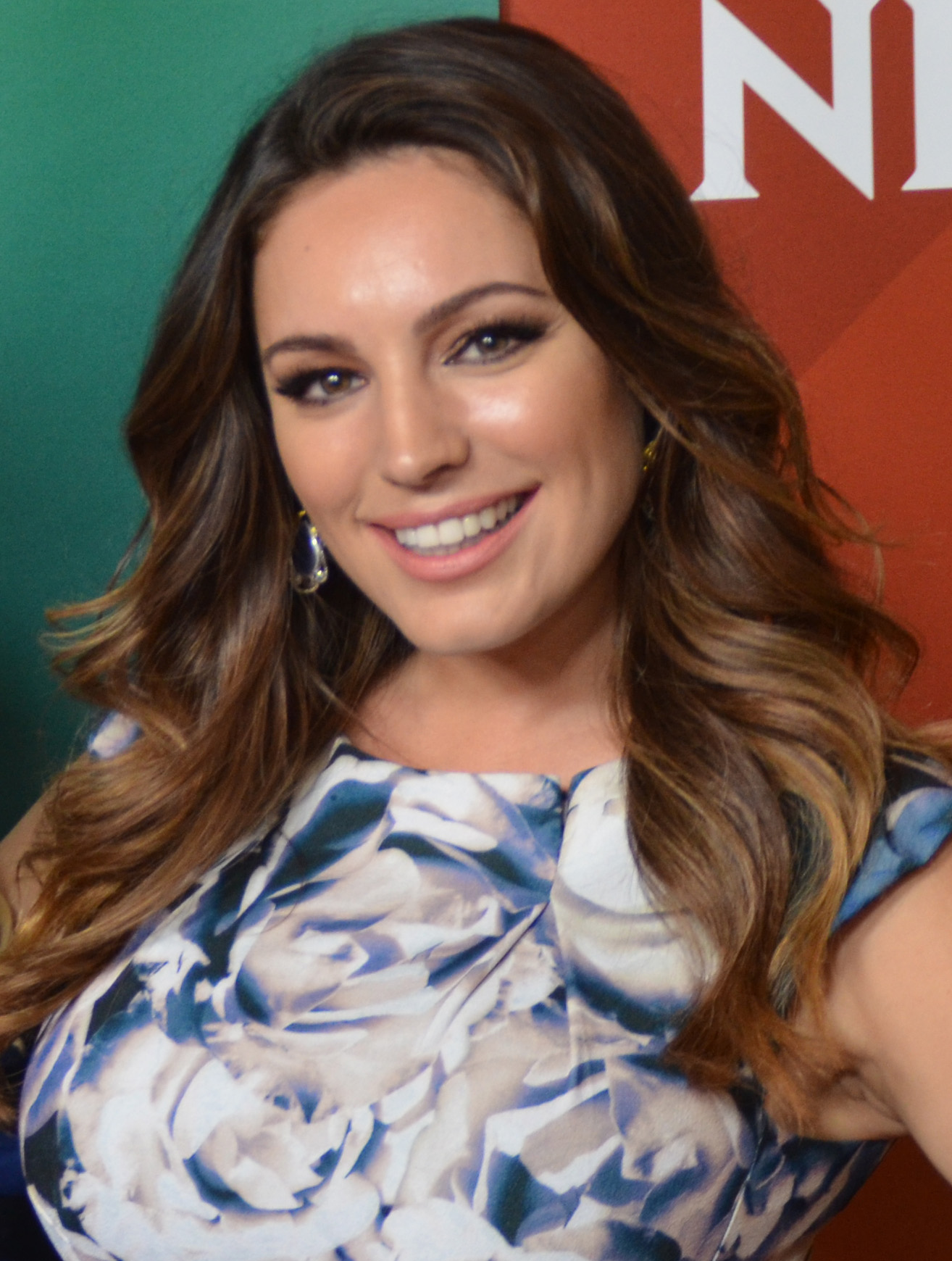
Kelly Brook

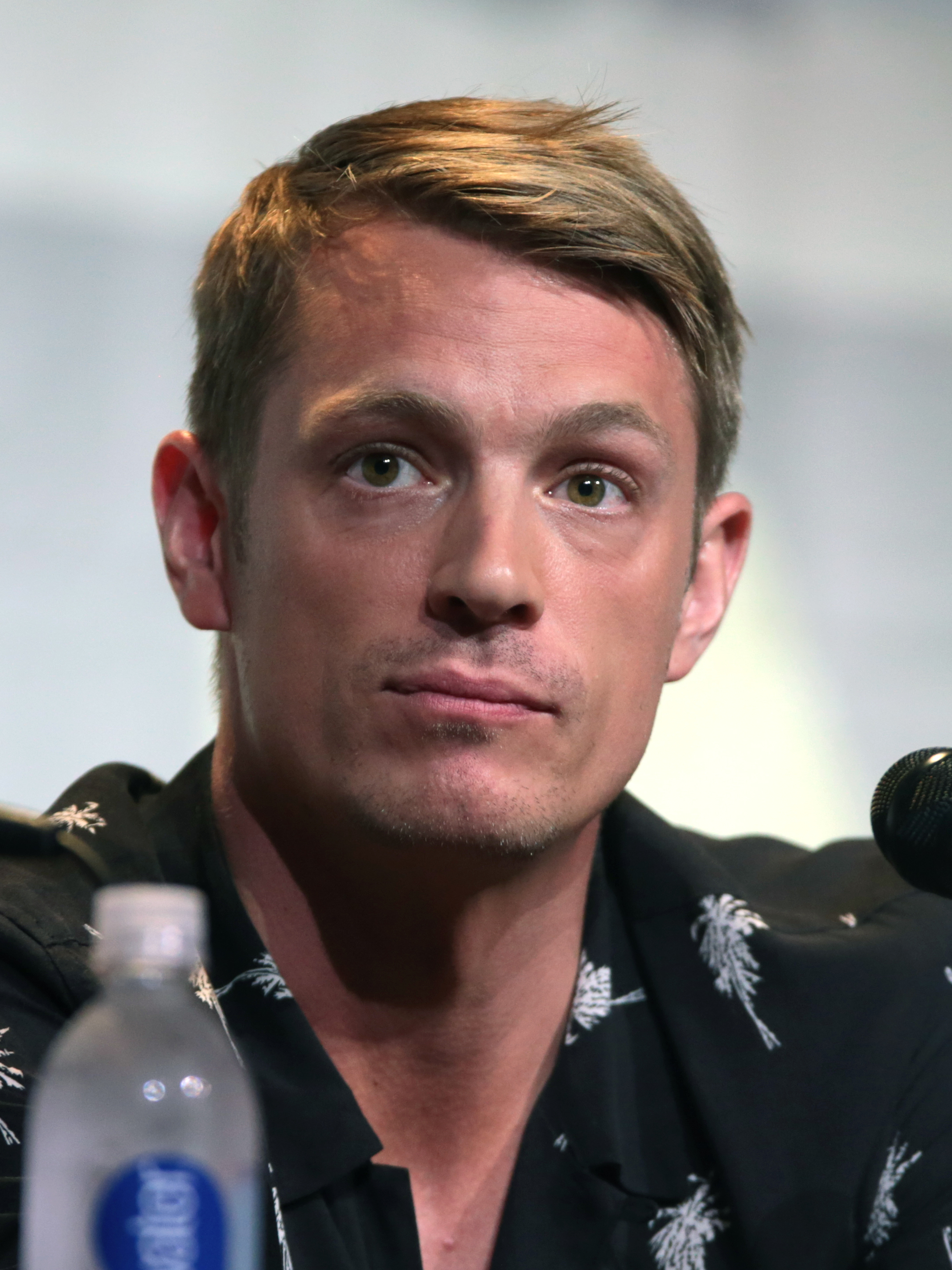
Joel Kinnaman

- November 1
  - Coco Crisp, American baseball player
  - Maeve Kennedy McKean, American public health official (d. 2020)
  - Atsuko Enomoto, Japanese voice actress
  - Milan Dudić, Serbian footballer
- November 2
  - Marián Čišovský, Slovak footballer (d. 2020)
  - Erika Flores, American actress
  - Anna Sobolak, Polish politician and businessperson
- November 3
  - Pablo Aimar, Argentine footballer
  - Tim McIlrath, American rock singer, songwriter (Rise Against)
- November 4 – Audrey Hollander, American porn actress
- November 5
  - Leonardo Nam, Australian actor
  - Tarek Boudali, French actor
  - Patrick Owomoyela, German Footballer of Nigerian descent
- November 6
  - Lamar Odom, African-American retired basketball player
  - Myolie Wu, Hong Kong actress
- November 7 – Jon Peter Lewis, American singer and songwriter
- November 8
  - Aaron Hughes, Northern Irish footballer
  - Dania Ramirez, Dominican actress
  - Dash Berlin, Dutch DJ and music producer
  - Salvatore Cascio, Italian actor
- November 9
  - Cory Hardrict, American actor
  - Darren Trumeter, American actor and comedian
  - Caroline Flack, English television and radio presenter and actress (d. 2020)
- November 12
  - Matt Cappotelli, American professional wrestler (d. 2018)
  - Cote de Pablo, Chilean actress
  - Matt Stevic, Australian rules football umpire
- November 13
  - Henry Wolfe, American actor and musician
  - Metta World Peace, American basketball player
- November 14
  - Mavie Hörbiger, German actress
  - Olga Kurylenko, Ukrainian model and actress
  - Mpule Kwelagobe, Miss Universe 1999
  - Osleidys Menéndez, Cuban javelin thrower
- November 17 – Matthew Spring, English footballer
- November 18 – Neeti Mohan, Indian playback singer
- November 19
  - Barry Jenkins, American film director, producer, and screenwriter
  - Larry Johnson, American football player
  - Michelle Vieth, American born Mexican actress and model
- November 20 – Ericson Alexander Molano, Colombian gospel singer
- November 21
  - Kim Dong-wan, South Korean singer and actor
  - Vincenzo Iaquinta, Italian footballer
- November 22
  - Chris Doran, Irish singer
  - Scott Robinson, English singer (5ive)
  - Njabuliso Simelane, Swaziland international footballer
- November 23
  - Kelly Brook, English actress and model
  - Nihat Kahveci, Turkish footballer
  - Ivica Kostelić, Croatian alpine skier
- November 24 – Carmelita Jeter, American sprinter
- November 25 – Joel Kinnaman, Swedish-American actor
- November 26 – Deborah Secco, Brazilian actress
- November 27
  - Ricky Carmichael, American motorcycle and stock car racer
  - Hilary Hahn, American violinist
- November 28
  - Dane Bowers, English singer-songwriter (Another Level)
  - Jamie Korab, Canadian curler
  - Hakeem Seriki, African-American rapper (Chamillionaire)
  - Daniel Henney, American actor and model
- November 29
  - Simon Amstell, English comedian and writer
  - Jayceon Taylor, American rapper (The Game)
- November 30
  - Diego Klattenhoff, Canadian actor
  - Andrés Nocioni, Argentinian basketball player

=== December ===
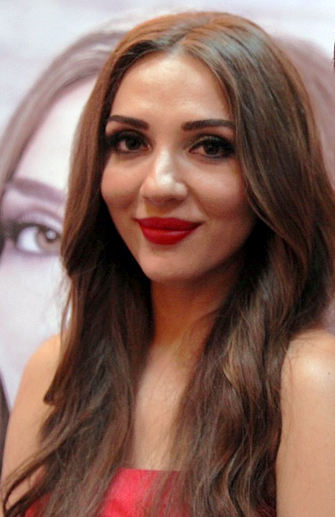
Sabina Babayeva

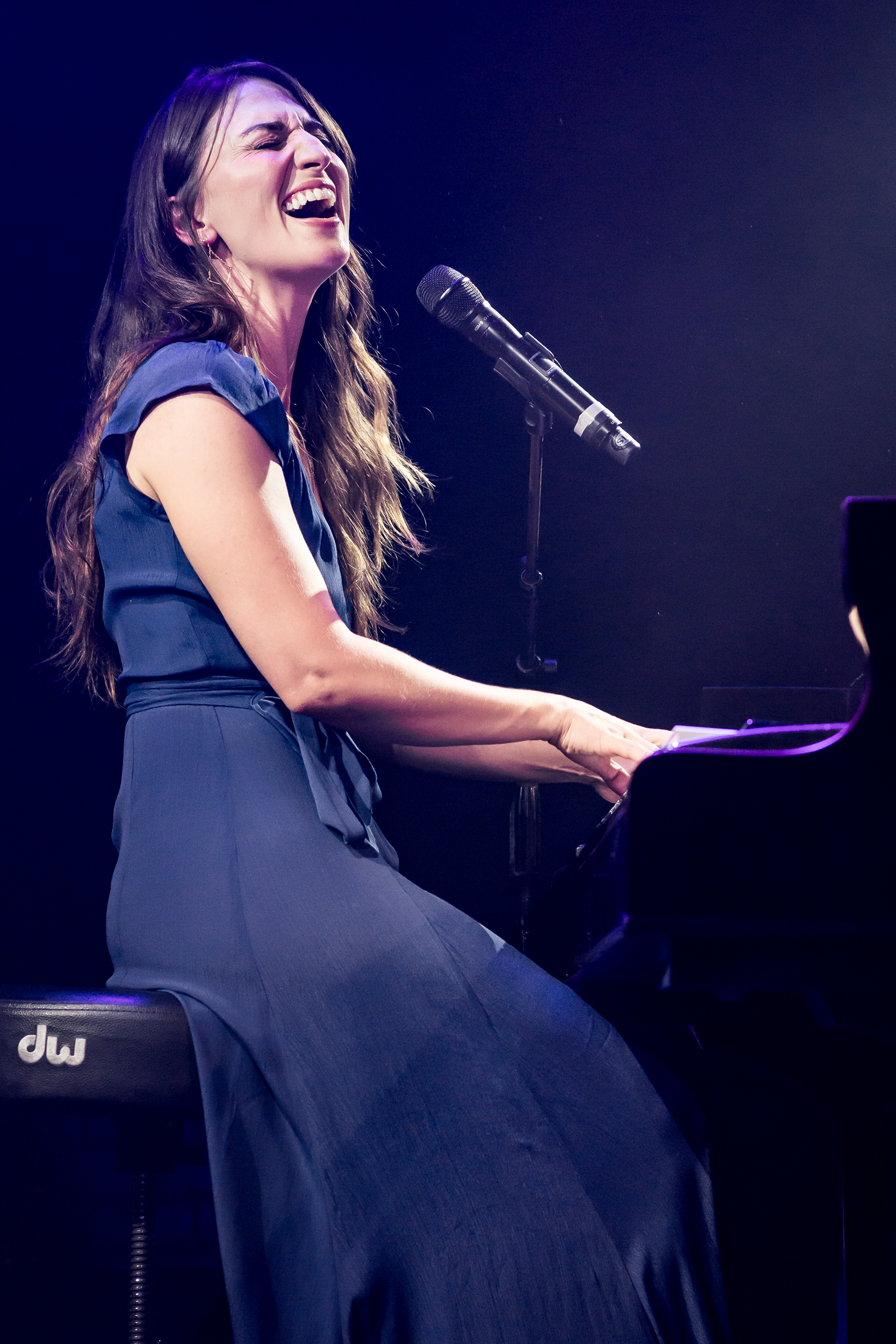
Sara Bareilles

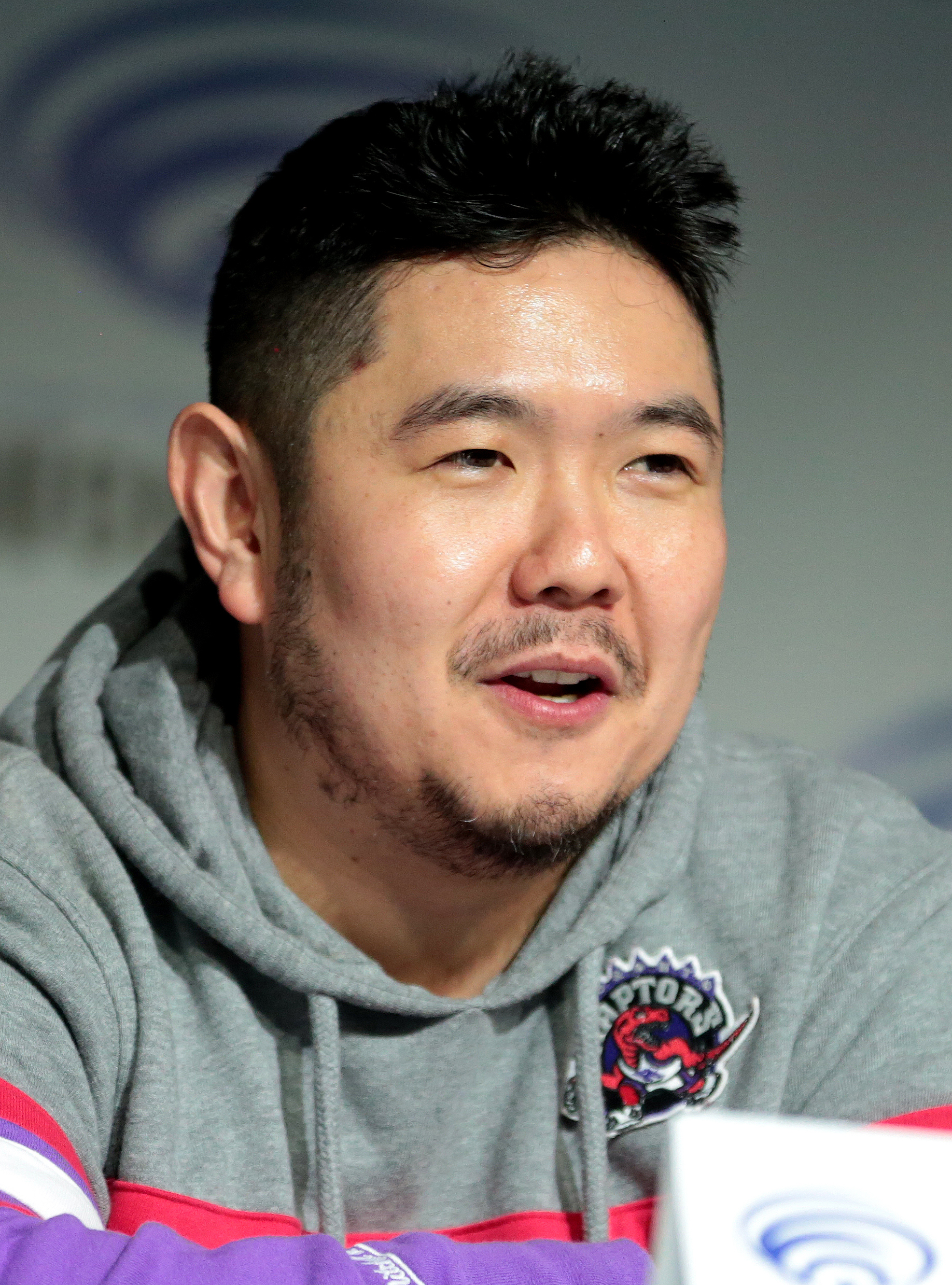
Eric Bauza

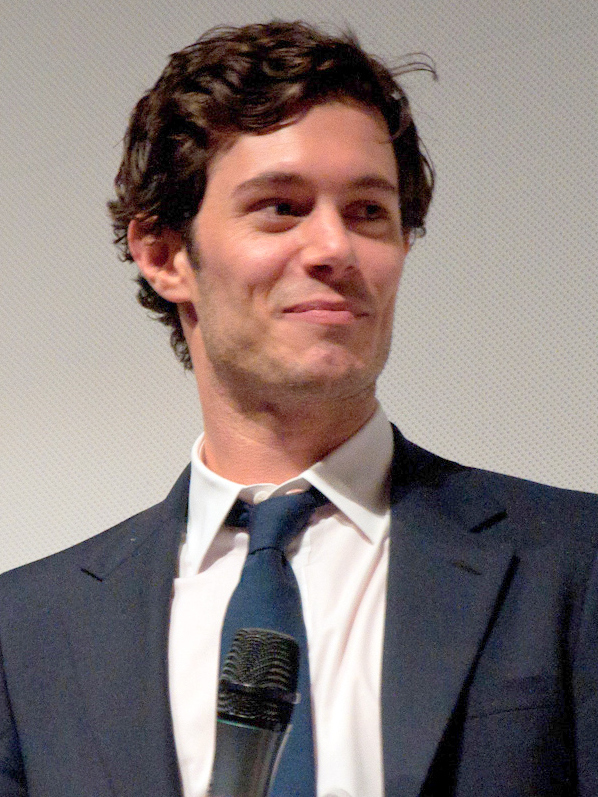
Adam Brody

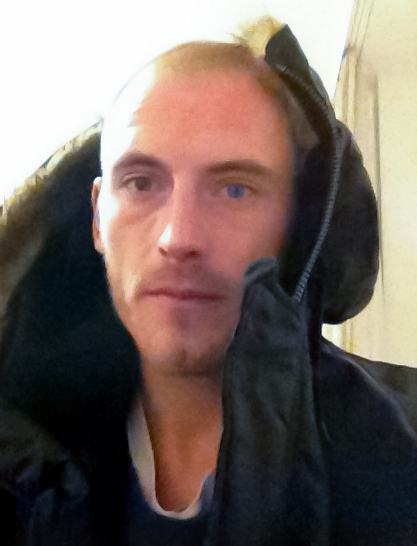
Zach Hill

- December 2
  - Sabina Babayeva, Azerbaijani singer
  - Yvonne Catterfeld, German singer, songwriter, actress, and television personality
- December 3
  - Daniel Bedingfield, English pop singer and songwriter
  - Rock Cartwright, American football player
  - Tiffany Haddish, American actress and comedian
- December 4 – Adrian Zandberg, Polish politician
- December 5 – Matteo Ferrari, Italian footballer
- December 6 – Tim Cahill, Australian footballer
- December 7
  - Eric Bauza, Canadian voice actor (d. 2026)
  - Sara Bareilles, American singer, songwriter and pianist
  - Ayako Fujitani, Japanese actress
  - Jennifer Carpenter, American actress
- December 8 – Ingrid Michaelson, American indie pop singer-songwriter
- December 10 – Keiko Nemoto, Japanese voice actress
- December 11 – Rider Strong, American actor, director, producer and screenwriter
- December 12
  - Emin Agalarov, Azerbaijani-Russian singer-songwriter and businessman
  - Barulaganye Bolofete, Botswana footballer
- December 14
  - Chris Cheng, American sport shooter
  - Michael Owen, English footballer
- December 15
  - Adam Brody, American actor
  - Eric Young, Canadian professional wrestler
  - Lee Carr, African-American singer and songwriter
- December 16
  - Trevor Immelman, South African golfer
  - Brodie Lee, American professional wrestler (d. 2020)
  - Daniel Narcisse, French handball player
  - Mihai Trăistariu, Romanian singer and musician
- December 17
  - Jaimee Foxworth, American actress and model
  - Erion Veliaj, Albanian politician, Mayor of Tirana
- December 19
  - Kevin Devine, American songwriter and musician
  - Paola Rey, Colombian actress and model
  - Tara Summers, English actress
- December 20
  - Flávio, Angolan footballer
  - Ramon Rodriguez, Puerto Rican actor
- December 22
  - Eleonora Lo Bianco, Italian volleyball player
  - Petra Majdič, Slovene cross-country skier
- December 23
  - Jacqueline Bracamontes, Mexican actress and beauty contest winner (Nuestra Belleza México 2000)
  - Kenny Miller, Scottish football player
- December 25 – Ferman Akgül, vocalist of Turkish nu-metal band maNga
- December 26
  - Chris Daughtry, American singer and guitarist
  - Dimitry Vassiliev, Russian ski jumper
- December 28
  - James Blake, American tennis player
  - André Holland, American actor
  - Bree Williamson, Canadian actress
  - Robert Edward Davis, German-American rapper
  - Zach Hill, American drummer (Death Grips)
- December 29 – Diego Luna, Mexican actor
- December 30
  - Flávio Amado, Angolan footballer
  - Milana Terloeva, Chechen journalist and author
  - Yelawolf, American rapper
- December 31
  - Bob Bryar, American drummer (My Chemical Romance) (d. 2024)
  - Elaine Cassidy, Irish actress
  - Josh Hawley, American politician, U.S. Senator (R-MO) from 2019
  - Emma Little-Pengelly, Northern Irish politician, Deputy First Minister of Northern Ireland

=== Unknown date ===
- Irene Cuadrado, Spanish painter.

== Nobel Prizes ==

- Physics – Sheldon Glashow, Abdus Salam, Steven Weinberg
- Chemistry – Herbert C. Brown, Georg Wittig
- Medicine – Allan MacLeod Cormack, Godfrey Hounsfield
- Literature – Odysseas Elytis
- Peace – Mother Teresa
- Economics – Theodore Schultz, W. Arthur Lewis
