= Aaron Tolson =

American choreographer

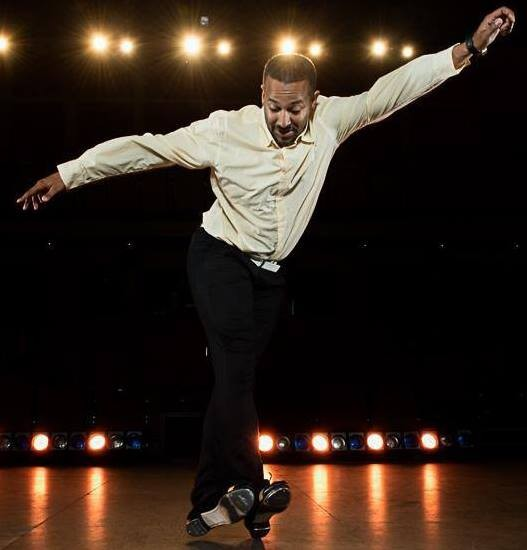
- Born: Manchester, New Hampshire
- Education: St. Johns University
- Occupations: Tap Dancer and So Danca Spokesperson
- Spouse: Emily Tolson
- Children: 2
- Website: http://aarontolson.com

Aaron Tolson (born Manchester, New Hampshire, United States) has been a tap dancer since 1986. He was the assistant choreographer, co-creator and assistant producer of Imagine Tap! - a tap show created with Derick Grant. He is currently an associate professor of dance at The Boston Conservatory in Boston, Massachusetts and is the founder, choreographer, and director for the pre-professional tap company Speaking in Taps.

== Education and Track Career ==
At age 14, Tolson joined the track team at Manchester Memorial High School. Throughout his four-year high school career, he set every high school record in the event he competed in, including the 55 and 300-meter indoor dashes and the 100 and 200-meter outdoor events. Tolson's times qualified him to compete in the 1992 U.S. Olympic Trials and earned him induction into the Memorial High School and Manchester, NH Halls of Fame. Graduating high school, he earned a full scholarship to St. Johns University, where he once again set records in track. A number of them still stand to this day. In 1996, he was once again invited to compete in the U.S. Olympic Trials.

Tolson graduated from St. Johns University in 1997 with a Bachelor of Science degree in communications.

== Tap Dance Career ==
Aaron Tolson started dancing at the age of ten in Lawrence, Massachusetts. Four years into his dance career he was performing in the Great Tap Reunion at the Apollo Theater alongside tap legends Derick Grant, Savion Glover, Gregory Hines, and the cast of the movie Tap. Soon after, Tolson met Julia Boynton in Boston, who guided him in the direction of tap as a lifestyle.

While attending college at St. Johns University, Tolson was honing his tap technique in Manhattan. His senior year of college led him to the New York Shakespeare Festival tap program, also known as Funk U! Soon Tolson became a company member of Manhattan Tap. Jumping feet-first into choreography, he landed a job with Absolut in a national tour called Absolut Tap! He choreographed a piece for their second tour and was a dance captain for all of the teams for two years. Soon after, Tolson accepted a role in the national and international tours of Riverdance. He was a soloist and the captain of the tap dancers during his six-year run with the show and had the opportunities to perform on Broadway, at Radio City Music Hall, on various TV shows, at NBA games, and on stages all over the world.

=== Imagine Tap! ===
In 2006, Tolson began working with longtime friend Derick K. Grant on Imagine Tap!, a Chicago-based show whose formation would eventually become the subject of a feature-length documentary, titled Tap or Die. Tolson performed in the show alongside Grant and fellow tap dancers Jason Samuels Smith, Michelle Dorrance, Chloe Arnold, Dormeshia Sumbrey-Edwards, Ayodele Casel, Joseph Wiggin, Jason Janas, Jared Grimes, Jumaane Taylor, Tre Dumas, Brill Barrett, and more.

== Teaching the Next Generation ==
=== New England Tap Ensemble ===
Aaron founded New England Tap Ensemble, a non-profit organization, in May 2007. His goal was to promote the art of tap dance in the community while fostering a sense of individuality in a professional artist. While he was a faculty member at The Boston Conservatory and Plymouth State University, he choreographed, produced, and directed Something to Tap About, Tapped, Tapped In, and Inspired, which all featured performers from New England Tap Ensemble. The youth organization resolved in 2010.

=== Speaking in Taps ===
Following the conclusion of the New England Tap Ensemble, Tolson founded Speaking in Taps in 2010. Speaking in Taps, which is commonly abbreviated as "SIT," is a pre-professional youth tap company. Members range in age from 10 to 20-years old and hail from all over New England. In January 2021, the company put on their first show since the pandemic, Something to Tap About. It was the first show the company has put on that only features choreographed dances by Tolson and improv solos by multiple members.

Because of the COVID-19 pandemic in 2020, the company expanded their platform and added "remote members" which call into rehearsals via Zoom.

== Personal life ==
In 2017, Tolson resumed to his teaching position at The Boston Conservatory as an associate professor of dance. He currently resides in Bedford, NH with his wife and two daughters.

In correspondence with Bedford Community Television, Tolson created his own show, The Aaron Tolson Entertainment and Variety Show, in September 2017. It ran for a total of five episodes, airing the final one in late August 2018.
