= List of awards and nominations received by George C. Wolfe =

George C. Wolfe awards and nominations
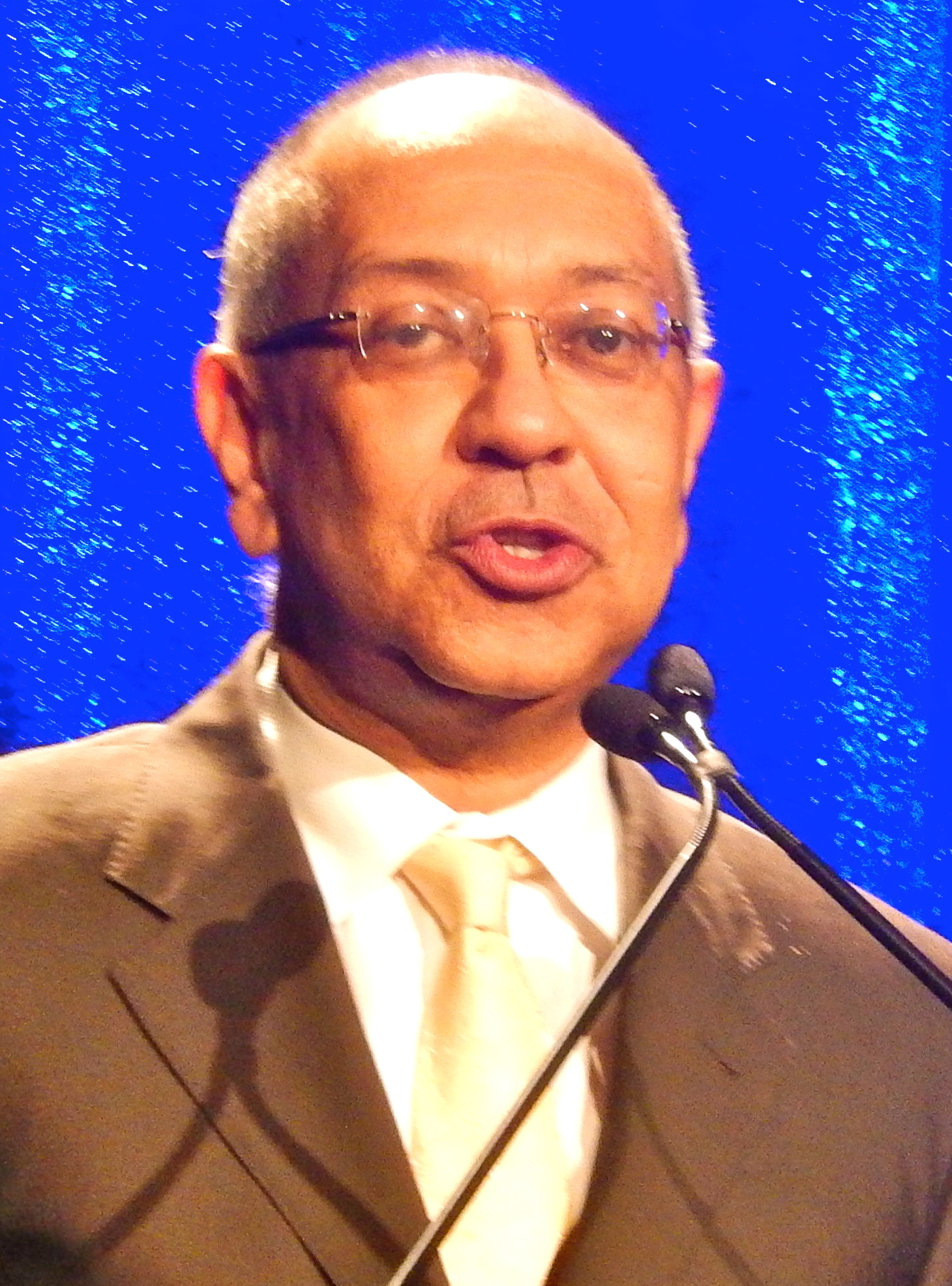
Award	Wins	Nominations
Emmy Awards	0	1
Tony Awards	3	15

George C. Wolfe is an American stage and screen director, playwright and producer.

Over his career he has been nominated for fifteen Tony Awards, ten of those nominations being for Director of a Play or Musical. He has received three Tony Awards for Angels in America: Millennium Approaches in 1993, Bring in 'da Noise, Bring in 'da Funk in 1996 and Elaine Stritch at Liberty in 2002. For his work in theatre he has also received three Drama Desk Awards, two Obie Awards, a Drama League Award, and an Outer Critics Circle Award, and a Lucille Lortel Award. For his work in film and television he received a Directors Guild of America Award for Outstanding Directing – Miniseries or TV Film for Lackawanna Blues in 2005. He also has been nominated for a Primetime Emmy Award, a Writers Guild of America Award and an Independent Spirit Award.

== Major associations ==
=== Tony Awards ===
Year	Category	Nominated work	Result	Ref.
1992	Best Book of a Musical	Jelly's Last Jam	Nominated	
1992	Best Direction of a Musical	Jelly's Last Jam	Nominated	
1993	Best Direction of a Play	Angels in America: Millennium Approaches	Won	
1994	Best Direction of a Play	Angels in America: Perestroika	Nominated	
1996	Best Direction of a Musical	Bring in 'da Noise, Bring in 'da Funk	Won	
1996	Best Original Score	Bring in 'da Noise, Bring in 'da Funk	Nominated	
2000	Best Book of a Musical	The Wild Party	Nominated	
2002	Best Special Theatrical Event	Elaine Stritch At Liberty	Won	
2004	Best Direction of a Musical	Caroline, Or Change	Nominated	
2011	Best Direction of a Play (with Joel Grey)	The Normal Heart	Nominated	
2013	Best Direction of a Play	Lucky Guy	Nominated	
2016	Best Book of a Musical	Shuffle Along	Nominated	
2016	Best Direction of a Musical	Shuffle Along	Nominated	
2018	Best Direction of a Play	The Iceman Cometh	Nominated	
2019	Best Direction of a Play	Gary: A Sequel to Titus Andronicus	Nominated	
2024	Special Tony Award	Lifetime Achievement in the Theatre	Honored	

=== Emmy Award ===
Year	Category	Nominated work	Result	Ref.
Primetime Emmy Awards
2005	Outstanding Directing for a Limited Series	Lackawanna Blues	Nominated	

== Industry awards ==
=== Directors Guild of America Award ===
Year	Category	Nominated work	Result	Ref.
2006	Outstanding Directing – Miniseries or TV Film	Lackawanna Blues	Won	
2018	Outstanding Directing – Miniseries or TV Film	The Immortal Life of Henrietta Lacks	Nominated	

=== Writers Guild of America Awards ===
Year	Category	Nominated work	Result	Ref.
2018	Television: Long Form – Adapted	The Immortal Life of Henrietta Lacks	Nominated	

=== Independent Spirit Awards ===
Year	Category	Nominated work	Result	Ref.
2006	Best First Feature	Lackawanna Blues	Nominated	

== Theatre awards ==
=== Drama Desk Awards ===
Year	Category	Nominated work	Result	Ref.
1992	Outstanding Book of a Musical	Jelly's Last Jam	Won	
1992	Outstanding Director of a Musical	Jelly's Last Jam	Nominated	
1993	Outstanding Director of a Play	Angels in America: Millennium Approaches	Won	
1996	Outstanding Director of a Musical	Bring in 'da Noise, Bring in 'da Funk	Nominated	
1996	Outstanding Director of a Play	The Tempest	Nominated	
2002	Outstanding Director of a Musical	Elaine Stritch At Liberty	Nominated	
2004	Outstanding Director of a Musical	Caroline, Or Change	Nominated	
2011	Outstanding Director of a Play	The Normal Heart	Won	

=== Drama League Award ===
Year	Category	Nominated work	Result	Ref.
1996	Distinguished Achievement	Bring in 'da Noise, Bring in 'da Funk	Won	

=== Lucille Lortel Awards ===
Year	Category	Nominated work	Result	Ref.
2002	Unique Theatrical Experience	Elaine Stritch at Liberty	Won	

=== Obie Award ===
Year	Category	Nominated work	Result	Ref.
1990	Direction	Spunk	Won	
2002	Direction	Topdog/Underdog	Won	

=== Outer Critics Circle Awards ===
Year	Category	Nominated work	Result	Ref.
1994	Outstanding Director of a Play	Twilight: Los Angeles, 1992	Won	
2002	Outstanding Director of a Play	Topdog/Underdog	Nominated	
2004	Outstanding Director of a Musical	Caroline or Change	Nominated	

== Miscellaneous awards ==
=== Black Reel Awards ===
Year	Category	Nominated work	Result	Ref.
2006	Outstanding Director, TV Movie or Limited Series	Lackawanna Blues	Won	

=== NAACP Image Awards ===
Year	Category	Nominated work	Result	Ref.
2021	Outstanding Directing in a Motion Picture	Ma Rainey's Black Bottom	Nominated	
