= Michelle Dorrance =

American tap dancer and choreographer (born 1979)

- Born: September 12, 1979 (age 47); Chapel Hill, North Carolina, U.S.
- Occupations: Dancer, choreographer

Michelle Dorrance (born September 12, 1979) is an American tap dancer, performer, choreographer, teacher and director. Awarded a MacArthur "Genius Grant", she is the Founder and artistic director of Dorrance Dance. Dorrance is known for her creative ensemble choreography, rhythm tap style and ambitious collaborative projects with fellow tap dance choreographers and musicians. She is currently a 2017 Choreographic Fellow at New York City Center and an Artist in Residence at the American Tap Dance Foundation. Dorrance lives in Brooklyn, New York.

== Early life ==
Dorrance was raised in Chapel Hill, North Carolina, by her mother M'Liss Gary Dorrance, a former dancer with Eliot Feld's American Ballet Company and The National Ballet of Washington, D.C. and the founder and director of the Ballet School of Chapel Hill, and her father Anson Dorrance, long-term coach of the UNC Women's Soccer team, who led the U.S. Women's Soccer Team through the inaugural Women's World Cup in 1991. Dorrance has two younger siblings, Natalie Dorrance Harris and Donovan Dorrance.

== Training ==
Dorrance formally trained at the Ballet School of Chapel Hill, founded by her mother. There, she studied ballet, jazz and tap dance with tap master Gene Medler.

At age eight, Dorrance was accepted into T.C.T.C. (The Children's Tap Company), which is now the North Carolina Youth Tap Ensemble. In addition to providing intensive technical training in tap dance and practice of tap improvisation, Medler introduced his dancers to as many living tap masters as possible. Both through Medler's mentorship and her own pursuit of further study, Dorrance learned from tap dance greats Maceo Anderson, Dr. Cholly Atkins, Clayton "Peg Leg" Bates, Bunny Briggs, Dr. James "Buster" Brown, Ernest "Brownie" Brown, Harriet "Quicksand" Browne, Dr. Harold Cromer, Arthur Duncan, Gregory Hines, Miss Mable Lee, Dr. Jeni LeGon, Dr. Henry LeTang, LeRoy Myers, Dr. Fayard Nicholas and Harold Nicholas (Nicholas Brothers), Donald O'Connor, Dr. Leonard Reed, Dr. Jimmy Slyde and Dr. Prince Spencer. Dorrance also surrounded herself with the generation of tap dancers who learned from those greats, including Josh Hilberman, Barbara Duffy, Savion Glover, Brenda Bufalino, Ted Levy, Sam Weber, Mark Mendonca, Van Porter and Dianne Walker. This early education from tap dance masters shaped Dorrance's appreciation for the form and its legacy.

== Education ==
Dorrance received a BA from NYU's Gallatin School of Individualized Study, where she created a major that dealt with concepts of American race in relationship to democracy in American culture, themes she explores in her current choreography. During her early years in New York, she attended Buster Brown's tap jams at Swing 46, where she connected and collaborated with dancers she reveres, like Brown, Glover, Lee, Slyde, Jason Samuels Smith, Michela Marino-Lerman, Dormeshia Sumbry-Edwards and Max Pollack.

== Career ==
Many of Dorrance's first professional performances occurred when she was a teenager, with the North Carolina Youth Tap Ensemble at major international tap dance festivals. She also performed as a soloist with swing-revival icons, the Squirrel Nut Zippers when she was 16, and in 1997 was the youngest cultural ambassador to Russia from Chapel Hill, North Carolina. In 2001, Savion Glover invited Dorrance to be a founding member of his group Ti Dii. In 2007, she joined the New York City cast of STOMP, where she received immediate praise, later touring with the North American and international casts. She was also a featured soloist in STOMP creators Luke Cresswell and Steve McNicholas's opening number for the 2011 Royal Variety Show. She later performed in Emmy-nominated Jason Samuel Smith's Chasing the Bird/Charlie's Angels with Dormeshia Sumbry-Edwards and Chloe Arnold in 2007, 2009 and 2011. Dorrance also performs as a bassist and backup vocalist with indie-pop artist and childhood friend, Darwin Deez.

== Teaching ==
Dorrance was on faculty at Broadway Dance Center in Manhattan from 2002 to 2015, while teaching periodically at Steps on Broadway and Peridance Center in New York. She is also on faculty as part of Nicholas Van Young's Institute for the Rhythmic Arts (IFTRA). Dorrance has taught at Duke University, New York University, East Carolina University, The Ohio State University, Barnard College, Elon College, UC Santa Barbara and Wesleyan University. Dorrance is a teacher at tap dance festivals domestically and abroad, including the American Tap Dance Foundation's Tap City in New York, DC Tap Fest, The North Carolina Rhythm Tap Festival, the Stockholm Tap Festival, Brazil International Tap Festival, Chicago Human Rhythm Project's Rhythm World, the Vancouver International Tap Dance Festival, LA Tap Festival, Beantown Tap Festival in Boston, Austin's Soul to Sole Festival, Prague City Tap Festival, New Jersey Tap Festival, and Encontro dos Ritmos in Brazil. Dorrance also directed the Tap Program at The School at Jacob's Pillow in 2014.

In addition to teaching tap dance technique, a primary mission for Dorrance and her company, Dorrance Dance, is to increase awareness and understanding of tap dance history and contributions to American culture made by tap dance's forebears. Dorrance also lectures about tap dance, its history, and its cultural relevance at arts organizations, symposiums, universities, and panels.

== Dorrance Dance/Choreography ==
Dorrance founded her company, Dorrance Dance, in late 2010/early 2011. Its debut performance was on a shared evening with Dormeshia Sumbry-Edwards at Danspace Project, for which the company received a Bessie Award for "blasting open our notions about tap." Dorrance has since choreographed three evening-length works for the company: SOUNDspace (2012), The Blues Project (2013, a collaboration with Derick Grant, Toshi Reagon and Dormeshia Sumbry-Edwards), and ETM: The Initial Approach (2014, a collaboration with Nicholas Van Young). Dorrance's choreography has been described as "dynamite," "brilliant," "a marvel," and "a delight." In her current work, Dorrance "pays homage to tradition, yet she does everything differently, and she does everything very, very well." Dorrance's collaborative approach to working with other dancers and musicians has uniquely shaped her work.

Year Created	Choreography
2004	Bluegrass
2005-2007	A Suite for the City
2009	The Blues in "D"
2010-2011	a Petite Suite
2011	Remembering Jimmy
2011	Three to One
2012	Jungle Blues
2012	The Twelve/Eight
2013	SOUNDspace
2013	The Blues Project (Co-created with Toshi Reagon, original composition by Toshi Reagon, co-choreographed with Dormeshia Sumbry-Edwards and Derick K. Grant)
2014	Delta to Dusk
2014	ETM: The Initial Approach (Sound design by Nicholas Van Young, co-choreographed/co-composed with Nicholas Van Young)
2015	Myelination (Original composition by Gregory Richardson and Donovan Dorrance)
2016	ETM: Double Down (Sound design by Nicholas Van Young, co-choreographed/co-composed with Nicholas Van Young)
2017	Works & Process Rotunda Project (Co-Choreographed with Nicholas Van Young)
2017	Until the Real Thing Comes Along (Co-Choreographed with Melinda Sullivan, Josette Wiggan-Freund, Jillian Meyers, Hannah Heller)
2018	Elemental (Co-Choreographed with Nicholas Van Young)
2019	Destination Moon
2019	Basses Loaded (Music by Donovan Dorrance and Gregory Richardson, with Kate Davis and Michelle Dorrance)
2020	DD128QR
2021	It's Your Choice

== Awards ==
- USA Doris Duke Fellow – 2016
- JUBA! Award – 2016
- MacArthur "Genius Grant" – 2015
- Herb Alpert Award – 2014
- ATDF's Hoofer Award - 2014
- Jacob's Pillow Dance Award – 2013
- Princess Grace Award – 2012
- Bessie Award Winner – 2011

== Performance credits ==
- Barbara Duffy & Co.
- Max Pollak's Rumba Tap
- Tony Waag's Tap City on Tour
- Cintia Chameki's Ritmico
- Rhythm Kaneko's Groovin' High
- CPD
- Lynn Dally's JazzTap Ensemble
- Savion Glover's company Ti Dii
- Opening Ceremonies for the 2001 Cannes Film Festival
- 2002 Winter Olympics
- the Nijinsky Awards
- the Jerry Lewis Telethon
- Savion Glover at The Beacon Theatre
- The Apollo Theater's 70th Anniversary Concert
- the debut of Improvography at the Joyce Theater
- Derick K. Grant's Imagine Tap!
- Música (2024)
