= Ed Levy (disambiguation) =

Ed Levy (1916–2008) was a baseball player.

Ed Levy or Ed Levi may also refer to:

- Edward H. Levi (1911–2000), former United States Attorney General
- Edward Lawrence Levy (1851–1932), British world weightlifting champion
- Edward Lawrence Levy (fraudster) (died 1892), Victorian solicitor convicted of forgery, fraud and perjury
- Ed Levy (tennis), tennis player (see SAP Open)
- Ted Levy, rugby player
- Edward Levy (writer), horror writer
- Edward Levy-Lawson, 1st Baron Burnham (1833–1916), British newspaper proprietor
