= Hope Clarke =

American actress (1941–2026)

- Born: March 23, 1941; Washington, D.C., U.S.
- Died: July 23, 2026 (aged 85); Murfreesboro, Tennessee, U.S.
- Occupations: Actress; choreographer; dancer; vocalist
- Years active: 1960–2026
- Awards: Dramalogue Award, Joseph Calloway Award, NAACP Image, Outer Critics Award

Hope Clarke (March 23, 1941 – July 23, 2026) was an American actress, dancer, vocalist, choreographer, and opera director. In 1995, she became the first black director of a major U.S. opera production, when she staged Porgy and Bess at the Houston Grand Opera.

== Early life and education ==
Born in Washington, D.C. to Maurice Aloysius Clarke And Hope Aldridge, Clarke was raised with her sister, Barbara, in a middle class Black community, a place where people shopped through mail-order catalogues in order to purchase clothes offered in stores where they were not welcomed. “The black community, as I remember it, was very closely knit," Clarke said in the San Francisco Examiner: "Before the fabric of this society was torn by racism and lack of education, we all took care of each other. We all watched each other's children."

Clarke began studying dance with her sister at the Alma Davis Dance School in Washington, DC. She attended Spingarn High School, and graduated in 1959. In her senior year, she was a lead dancer with Doris W. Jones and her company.

She worked as a summer employee for the CIA.

== Career ==
=== West Side Story to Don’t Bother Me, I Can’t Cope ===
In 1959, Clarke landed a role in the original touring cast of West Side Story. At the urging of her sister, she auditioned for the role, got it, and joined the touring company while it was in Chicago, and remained in the cast until April 23, 1960. In 1961, Clarke appeared in the interracial love story Kwamina starring Brock Peters and Robert Guillaume, and featuring the choreography of Agnes de Mille.

In 1966, Clarke appeared in the Metropolitan Opera's first production of Samuel Barber's Antony and Cleopatra.

In 1967, she played a minor role and was part of the ensemble in Hallelujah, Baby!, which received five Tony Awards, including Best Musical. In addition, she starred in the New York performances of Talley Beatty's reformed dance company after his residency in Sweden.

In 1968, she played Mamselle Tulip in The House of Flowers at the Lucille Lortel Theatre. In 1969, Clarke had a role in Douglas Turner Ward’s “The Reckoning” at the St. Mark’s Playhouse, an off-off Broadway theater that showcased the work of the Negro Ensemble Company.

In 1970, Clarke was a dancer in "Purlie", a musical that nominated for five Tony Awards. In 1972, she was in the musical "Don’t Bother Me, I Can’t Cope", which was the first Broadway musical to be directed by an African American woman, Vinnette Carroll.

=== Alvin Ailey, Katherine Dunham, and 5 Plus ===
Clarke served as a principal dancer in the Katherine Dunham Company and the Alvin Ailey American Dance Theater.

In the Ailey company, she toured internationally and received positive reviews and audience ovations. In the 1960s, she appeared in Louis Johnson's Lament, which is part of Ailey's permanent repertoire. In 1978, Clarke co-starred with James Truitte and Carmen de Lavallade in Alvin Ailey's 20th Anniversary reunion performance.

In addition to dancing with Dunham and Ailey, Clarke performed with companies directed by Tally Beatty and Louis Johnson. As well, Clarke was a guest artist with the George Faison Universal Dance Experience and appeared in the company's 1974 New York performances that paid tribute to Billie Holiday and Otis Redding.

Clarke, Michael Blake, Carmen de Lavallade, Sheila Rohan, and other artists co-founded the 5 Plus Ensemble (New Beginnings Theater), a dance company that was created to showcase the work of dancers, choreographers, and musicians who are older than the age of 50.

=== Film and television ===
After appearing on Broadway and around the world as a dancer, Clarke moved to Hollywood, California with the help of actor and friend Raymond St. Jacques. Her most memorable film roles were co-starring with Sidney Poitier in A Piece of the Action (1977); working with St. Jacques and Philip Michael Thomas on the A Book of Numbers' set in Dallas; and portraying Jean-Michel Basquiat's mother, Matilde, in Basquiat (1996). Clarke had a variety of guest roles on tv shows, such as Hill Street Blues, Amen, Another World, As the World Turns, Beat Street, Hart to Hart, Into the Night, The Jeffersons, The Ropers, Sex and the City, and Three's Company. She appeared in the TV miniseries King (1978), which was based upon the life of Martin Luther King Jr., the slain civil rights leader.

=== Collaborations with George C. Wolfe ===
In 1986, Broadway director and producer George C. Wolfe hired Clarke to create movement and staging for The Colored Museum. This production began a long-term Wolfe-Clarke theatrical collaboration; the pair directed and choreographed 10 plays and musicals together, including the opera Amistad, the Off-Broadway play, Spunk, and several Broadway shows, such as Jelly's Last Jam; Caroline, Or Change; and A Free Man of Color.

In 1992, Clarke earned a Tony Award nomination for "Best Choreography" for her work in Jelly's Last Jam. The show grew from New York workshops and a Los Angeles production at the Mark Taper Forum to a Broadway show.

In November 2003, she started work on Caroline, or Change, a musical that features spirituals, blues, Motown, classical music, and Jewish Klezmer. Clarke was responsible for the choreography of the show that began as an Off-Broadway production, received a Broadway production of 126 performances in 2004, received six Tony Award nominations, and had a two-month run at the Lyttleton Theatre, National Theatre in London, winning the Olivier Award for Best New Musical.

In 2010, Clarke choreographed A Free Man of Color.

=== More Broadway, Off Broadway, and Regional Theater ===
In 1985, Clarke played "Ruby" in the musical Grind and worked with Lester Wilson.

In 1995, Clarke choreographed William Shakespeare's "The Tempest".

In 1997, Clarke adapted and directed Nobody Says Baby Like A Black Man, a dramatic collage of African American love poems, at the American Place Theater in New York.

In 2017, she choreographed, Fly, a play about the Tuskegee Airmen. The show was produced by the Lincoln Center Institute and toured to several venues, including Alabama Shakespeare Festival, Pasadena Playhouse, Florida Studio Theatre, St. Louis Rep, Cincinnati Playhouse, Ford's Theatre, Vineyard Playhouse, and Crossroads Theatre.

In 2025, Clarke choreographed Blues in the Night at the Arizona Theatre Company.

=== Porgy & Bess: The Opera ===
In 1995, Clarke directed the Houston Grand Opera production of Porgy & Bess, the first African American to stage a major professional U.S. staging of "Porgy and Bess". Regarded as America’s greatest opera, the two million dollar Houston Grand production toured throughout the United States, as well as performances in France, Italy, and Japan.

In 2012, Clarke directed a Morgan State University production of Porgy & Bess at the Murphy Fine Arts Center.

=== Quotable ===
- "I want African Americans who come to see the opera to be proud that an African American is directing the production and to recognize the people on stage."
- "Blacks and women have been locked out of directing major productions for too long. It's time for us not only to tell our stories but to direct them."
- "As a director, I guess I bring in the female sensibilities. Since I'm also an actress, I've really tried to develop the characterizations so that the performers don't do a little singing here, and some acting there. And coming from a black perspective, I know how we think, how we feel, what we do. I understand the little things. That makes a difference."
- "In my production, everybody works. Everybody has some type of job. Just because you are poor doesn't mean you have to be slovenly or ignorant."

== Death ==
Clarke died in Murfreesboro, Tennessee, on July 23, 2026, at the age of 85.

== Honors and awards ==
- 2020 – Society of Stage Directors and Choreographers, elected to a three-year term to the Board of Directors.
- 2018 – 3rd Annual Project1VOICE HONORS, "to celebrate and honor artists whose talents continue to shape and enrich American culture."
- 2015–2018 – Broadway seasons, Tony Awards Nominating Committee.
- 2009–2012 – Broadway Seasons, Tony Awards Nominating Committee.
- 2004 – Lucille Lortel Award, Outstanding Choreographer, Caroline, Or Change
- 2001 – AUDELCO Recognition Awards for Excellence in Black Theatre (nomination), Choreographer, A Prophet Among Them
- 1998 – Society of Stage Directors and Choreographers, elected to Board of Directors.
- 1993 – Tony Award (nomination), Best Choreography (with Gregory Hines and Ted Levy), Jelly's Last Jam
- 1993 – Outer Critics Circle Award, Best Choreography (with Gregory Hines and Ted Levy), Jelly’s Last Jam
- 1992 – Drama Desk Award (nomination), Outstanding Choreography (with Gregory Hines and Ted Levy), Jelly's Last Jam
- 1991 – NAACP Image Award, Best Choreography, Jelly's Last Jam
- 1988 – Drama-Logue Award, Outstanding Choreography, The Colored Museum

== Credits ==
=== Stage ===
| Year | Title | Type | Venue | Role |
|---|---|---|---|---|
| 2025 | Blues in the Night | Musical | Arizona Theatre Company | Choreographer |
| 2023 | A Christmas Carol, A Ghost Story of Christmas | Musical, holiday | Hartford Stage | Choreographer |
| 2019 | The In-Gathering | Musical | New Professional Theatre at the Duke Theater | Choreographer |
| 2018 | A Christmas Carol, A Ghost Story of Christmas | Musical, holiday | Hartford Stage | Choreographer |
| 2017 | FLY | Play, drama | Alabama Shakespeare Festival, Pasadena Playhouse, Florida Studio Theatre, St. Louis Rep, Cincinnati Playhouse, Ford's Theatre, Vineyard Playhouse, Crossroads Theatre | Choreographer |
| 2016 | A Christmas Carol, A Ghost Story of Christmas | Musical, holiday | Hartford Stage | Choreographer |
| 2016 | The Roads to Home | Play, drama | Primary Stages, Cherry Lane Theater | Movement consultant |
| 2015 | Grey Gardens | Musical | Center Theatre Group, Bay Street Theatre | Choreographer |
| 2014 | A Christmas Carol, A Ghost Story of Christmas | Musical, holiday | Hartford Stage | Choreographer |
| 2013 | A Christmas Carol, A Ghost Story of Christmas | Musical, holiday | Hartford Stage | Choreographer |
| 2011 | Mr. Abbott Award Gala | Benefit | In honor of George C. Wolfe, New York | Choreographer |
| 2010–2011 | A Free Man of Color | Broadway play, original, drama | Vivian Beaumont Theater | Choreographer |
| 2010 | Agnes deMille: From Ballet to Broadway | Revue | St. Luke's Theatre | Performer |
| 2010 | Jesus Christ Superstar Gospel | Musical | Alliance Theatre | Choreographer |
| 2008 | Resurrection | Play | Philadelphia Theatre Company, Hartford Stage | Choreographer |
| 2006–2007 | Caroline, or Change | Musical, tour | The Lyttelton, at the National Theatre, London | Choreographer |
| 2006 | The Dreams of Sarah Breedlove | Play, drama | Goodman Theater | Choreographer |
| 2005 | The Learned Ladies of Park Avenue | Play | Hartford Stage | Choreographer |
| 2004 | Caroline, or Change | Broadway musical, original, drama | Eugene O'Neill Theatre | Choreographer |
| 2004 | Stormy Weather | Musical | New York | Choreographer |
| 2003 | Caroline, or Change | Off-Broadway musical, original, drama | Joseph Papp Public Theater/ Newman Theater | Choreographer |
| 2002 | The Odyssey | Play | Theater at St. Clement's | Musical staging |
| 2000 | A Christmas Carol, A Ghost Story of Christmas | Musical, holiday | Hartford Stage | Choreographer |
| 2000 | A Prophet Among Them | Play with music | Blue Heron Arts Center | Choreographer |
| 1999 | Mack and Mabel | Musical | Barrington Stage | Choreographer |
| 1999 | South Pacific | Musical | Pioneer Theatre | Choreographer |
| 1998 | Porgy and Bess | Ballet | Dallas Black Dance Theatre | Choreographer |
| 1998 | Cabaret | Musical | Cambridge Theatre Company | Choreographer |
| 1997 | Armistad | Opera | Lyric Opera | Choreographer |
| 1997 | Nobody Says Baby Like A Black Man | Off-Broadway play | American Place Theater | Director |
| 1996 | A ... My Name is Alice | Musical, revue | McGinn-Cazale Theater | Choreographer |
| 1996 | One Touch of Venus | Musical | New York City Center/ Mainstage | Choreographer |
| 1995 | Angel Levine | Off-Broadway musical | Playhouse 91 | Choreographer |
| 1995 | The Tempest | Off-Broadway Play, comedy, revival | Delacorte Theater | Choreographer |
| 1995 | The Tempest | Broadway play, comedy, revival | Broadhurst Theatre | Choreographer |
| 1993 | Sweet & Hot: The Songs of Harold Arlen | Musical | La Jolla Playhouse (West Coast Premiere) | Choreographer |
| 1992–1993 | Jelly's Last Jam | Broadway musical, original | Virginia Theatre | Choreographer (nominated for a Tony) |
| 1991 | Black Eagles | Play | New York City Center/ Stage II | Choreographer |
| 1991 | Così fan tutte | Opera | New York | Choreographer |
| 1990 | Spunk: Three Tales by Zora Neale Hurston | Off-Broadway play | Joseph Papp Public Theater/ Martinson Hall | Choreographer |
| 1990 | The Caucasian Chalk Circle | Play | Joseph Papp Public Theater/ Martinson Hall | Choreographer |
| 1988 | Porgy & Bess | Opera | Finnish National Opera and Brazil (Opera Ebony productions) | Choreographer |
| 1986 | The Colored Museum | Play | Joseph Papp Public Theater/ Susan Stein Shiva Theater | Choreographer |
| 1985 | Grind | Broadway musical, original | Mark Hellinger Theatre | Ruby / performer |
| 1981 | Black Nativity | Off-Broadway musical, original, all-Black cast | Ford Theatre | Choreographer |
| 1972–1974 | Don't Bother Me, I Can't Cope | Broadway musical, original, revue, all-Black cast | Playhouse Theatre, Edison Theatre | Performer |
| 1972 | Black Visions | Off-Broadway play | Joseph Papp Public Theater/ Annex | Choreographer |
| 1967–1968 | Hallelujah, Baby! | Broadway musical, original | Martin Beck Theatre | Performer |
| 1966 | Antony and Cleopatra | Opera | Metropolitan Opera | Dancer |
| 1960 | West Side Story | Broadway musical | Winter Garden Theatre, Alvin Theatre, and Tour Cities | Performer |

=== TV and Film ===
| Year | Title | Type | Role |
|---|---|---|---|
| 2023 | LEAP FOR JOY! In Celebration of National Dance Day | Short film, musical | Self |
| 2023 | Rustin | Film | Lucille Randolph |
| 2019 | Finding Julia | Film | Choreographer |
| 2004 | Men Without Jobs | Film | Ms. Jackson |
| 1996–2002 | Law & Order | TV Series | Multiple episodes: Mrs. Marbury, Appellate Judge #2, Judge Emma Reynolds |
| 2002 | Driving Fish | Short film | Betty |
| 2000 | Seventeen Again | TV Movie | Grandma Catherine “Cat” Donovan |
| 2002 | Sex and the City | TV Series | Lee |
| 1996 | New York Undercover | TV Series | Marilyn Ferris |
| 1996 | Basquiat | Film | Matilde |
| 1988 | A Father's Homecoming | TV Movie | Doctor |
| 1987 | Amen | TV Series | Carol Wilson |
| 1987 | Angel Heart | Film | Voodoo Dancer |
| 1985 | Into the Night | Film | Airport Cop |
| 1984 | Beat Street | Film | Assistant Choreographer |
| 1983 | The New Odd Couple | TV Series | Beth St. Clair |
| 1982 | Hill Street Blues | TV Series | Mrs. Reese |
| 1982 | Lois Gibbs and the Love Canal | TV Movie | Chris |
| 1981 | Maggie | TV Series | Receptionist |
| 1981 | Body and Soul | Film | Choreographer |
| 1980 | Scout's Honor | TV Movie | Mrs. Prewett |
| 1978 | The White Shadow | TV Series | Aunt Edna Hayward |
| 1979 | Three's Company | TV Series | Second Nurse |
| 1979 | Hart to Hart | TV Series | Teacher |
| 1979 | Miss Winslow and Son | TV Series | Cast member |
| 1979 | The Ropers | TV Series | Dr. Young |
| 1979 | Jennifer: A Woman's Story | TV Movie | Annie (secretary) |
| 1976; 1977–1978 | What's Happening!! | TV Series | Multiple episodes: Mrs. Watson, Elizabeth Duncan |
| 1974 | Good Times | TV Series | Brenda Gordon |
| 1978 | King | TV Mini Series | Multiple episodes: Mary |
| 1975 | The Jeffersons | TV Series | Sherry Barnes |
| 1977 | A Piece of the Action | Film | Sarah Thomas |
| 1973 | Book of Numbers | Film | Pigmeat Goins |
| 1971 | Going Home | Film | Mother at prison |
| 1969 | Change of Mind | Film | Nancy |
| 1968 | N.Y.P.D. | | Ivy |
