= Sammy Dyer =

African American choreographer/dancer/educator

Sammy Vashon Dyer (1905–1960) was an American dancer, choreographer, and dance teacher. He performed in the Broadway musical Runnin’ Wild (1923) and toured the Black theater circuit before settling in Chicago, where he founded the Sammy Dyer School of Dancing in 1933.

== Life and career ==
Dyer became a dancer who performed in Black cast Broadway shows, including Runnin’ Wild in 1923. In Runnin’ Wild (by Flournoy Miller and Aubrey Lyles, with James Johnson) Sammy Dyer played a Dancing Red Cap. That performance was credited with popularizing the Charleston on Broadway, and subsequently, all around the country.

By 1931 Dyer had relocated to Chicago, and by 1933 he had rented a storefront on Michigan Avenue to start a children’s dancing school. The Sammy Dyer School of Dancing taught jazz, ballet, tap, and acrobatics, with a focus on professional development.

Dyer also worked as a choreographer for prominent clubs and theaters in Chicago, like the Sunset Café, the Regal Theater, where he was ballet master, and managed the theater’s chorus dancers, the Regalettes, and the Palmer House, where he supervised Merriel Abbott's dancers, the Abbotteers. His most important position was at the Club DeLisa, where he managed the entertainment from its opening in 1934 until it closed in 1958. Located on Garfield and State Street, DeLisa became a top entertainment venue in Black Chicago. Open 24 hours a day for much of its run, the club featured house bands led by Fletcher Henderson and Red Saunders. Dyer was DeLisa’s choreographer, stage producer, and was responsible for the chorus dancers, the DeLisa Chorines. Because of his New York and touring history, and relationship with acts like Duke Ellington (whom he knew from his youth D.C., where Dyer worked for Ellington's sign painting business), Count Basie, and Cab Calloway, Dyer also handled some talent bookings. It was while working for Henderson at the DeLisa that pianist Herman Blount changed his stage name to Sun Ra, at Dyer’s suggestion.

In the early 1940s Dyer recruited some of the most talented dancers from his school to become the Dyerettes, an act that mixed dancing with comedy, acrobatics, and singing. As children Shirley Hall, Muriel Burns, Clarice White, Florence Saunders, Jean Cornell and Gloria Broussard performed at USO shows, and began appearing at Club DeLisa with the Saunders Orchestra, and playing early morning breakfast shows for overnight patrons. The Dyerettes would become an international touring act and from 1954-1958 were house openers at the Apollo Theater in New York. Ebony magazine declared them “one of the top dancing groups in the country.”

In addition to his work at the school and in nightclubs, Dyer also helped produce the Epic of a Race pageant at the 1933 Century of Progress World’s Fair at Soldier Field, and worked with prominent dance figures Katherine Dunham and Jeni LeGon. He helped organize Finnie’s Masquerade Ball, an annual Halloween drag show on the South Side that ran from 1935 until at least the 1970s. 5000 people reportedly attended the 1958 Finnie’s Ball at the Trianon Ballroom. Dyer choreographed the 1938 musical The Swing Mikado, an all-black cast interpretation of Gilbert and Sullivan’s Mikado, a production of the WPA's Federal Theatre Project. The show moved to Broadway where it competed with a production it inspired, The Hot Mikado (starring Bill “Bojangles” Robinson) which played at a theater across the street.

== Death and legacy ==
In 1959 Sammy Dyer became ill, and the Dyerettes ceased touring to help with his care. After a year-long illness, Dyer died in his native Washington D.C. on August 20, 1960. After a grand funeral at Chicago’s Bethel AME Church, with performances by Al Hibbler and Jo Ann Henderson, his body was returned to his city of birth for burial.

Dyer left the school to Dyerette Shirley Hall, who had recently married Chess Records executive Ralph Bass. The school continued, with Bass’ financial backing (it relocated to the Chess Records studio building at 2120 S Michigan Avenue for a time). Hall renamed it the Sammy Dyer School of the Theatre, and it was billed as “Under the Direction of Shirley Bass and The Dyerettes.” Hall developed a group of young performers in the Dyerettes mold called the Vashonettes (Vashon was Dyer’s middle name). The Vashonettes toured internationally and recorded for Checker Records.

=== Sammy Dyer School of the Theatre ===
The Dyer school became known for the professionalism of their shows, which featured live band accompaniment. Red Saunders led the band for the Dyer shows through the 1970s. He was succeeded by Byron Bowie (of Pieces of Peace, brother of Lester and Joseph Bowie). They also began the Operational Cultural Exchange Program with the Bahamas Dance Theatre in Nassau, which Hall founded after she established the Bahamas as her second home. From 1968 through 1998 groups of young students from Dyer School and Bahamas Dance Theatre would travel to each other’s countries to study and produce shows

Dyer School alumni and instructors include Brill Barret (M.A.D.D. Rhythms), Kyle Davis (Ballets Jazz Montreal), Randy Duncan (Joel Hall Dance Company), Taylor Edwards (HipLet ballet), Savion Glover, Broadway choreographer Ted Louis Levy (Jelly’s Last Jam), Charles McGregory (Houston Ballet), Star Trek actress Nichelle Nichols, Idella Reed, Darryl Pandy, George “Mo Leggs” Patterson, Tony-nominated actress Lauren Ridloff, and Jumanne Taylor.

Currently (as of 2026), the school shares space with Brill Barrett’s tap dance school at the Harold Washington Cultural Center, on the former site of the Regal Theater.
