= Shirley Hall Bass =

American dancer (1932–1998)

- Born: Shirley LaVada Hall; December 9, 1932; Chicago, Illinois, U.S.
- Died: July 27, 1998 (aged 65); Nassau, Bahamas
- Occupations: Entertainer, Tap Dancer, Choreographer, Educator
- Spouse: Ralph Bass (m. 1960)
- Website: shirleyhallbassfoundation.org

Shirley LaVada Hall Bass (December 9, 1932 – August 27, 1998) was an American dancer, vocalist, choreographer, and educator who performed across the United States and Canada with the all-female dance, vocal, and acrobatic act the Dyerettes from 1946 to 1960. The Dyerettes toured with Count Basie, Nat King Cole, Sammy Davis Jr., Duke Ellington, Tito Puente, and others. The Dyerettes served as house openers at New York City's Apollo Theater in Harlem from 1954 to 1958. In 1960, after the death of her mentor, Sammy Dyer, Hall took over the Sammy Dyer School of Dancing, training generations of Chicago dancers. Hall Bass also established a cultural exchange program between the Dyer School and the Bahamas, and became a founding director of that country's National Dance Company.

== Early years ==
Shirley Hall was born in Chicago, Illinois, on December 9, 1932, the daughter of Black Chicago migrants Walter Hall and La Vada Bufkin, both from Mississippi. Hall attended McCosh Elementary School (now named after former student Emmitt Till), Englewood High School, and studied ballet with Sadie Bruce (an important dance figure in the South Side's Bronzeville neighborhood) before she began attending the Sammy Dyer School of Dancing in 1940. Dyer, a prominent dancer and choreographer who had worked on Broadway in New York, moved to Chicago in 1931, and quickly established his dance school in Bronzeville at 3447 South Michigan Avenue. Dyer became a key figure in Black Chicago theater and nightlife, as producer and ballet master at the Regal Theater and floor manager of Club DeLisa. He helped produce the Epic of a Race pageant at the 1933 Century of Progress World's Fair at Soldier Field, and worked with prominent dance figures Katherine Dunham and Jeni LeGon. The Dyer School focussed on professional development. Dyer had previously created chorus dancer groups at the Regal (the Regalettes) and Club DeLisa (The DeLisa Chorines), but drawing upon his students' training in dance, theater, music, and acrobatics, he was able to create a more versatile act. Dyer made Hall a founding member of the Dyerettes.

== Career ==
=== 1946–1960: The Dyerettes ===
Hall began dancing professionally as a 12-year old in 1944, when she was amongst Dyer students recruited to perform shows at USO Servicemen's clubs and other shows for military members as the Dyerettes. Hall, Muriel Burns, Clarice White, Florence Saunders, Jean Cornell and Gloria Broussard, were the core members.

The Dyerettes began performing at the Club DeLisa, supporting the Red Saunders Orchestra with an act that included tap, tumbling, singing, comedy, and dancing on point. The teen dancers would perform four shows a night, and were also part of a breakfast revue that would perform early mornings to help transition all night partiers into the new day. Within a few years the women were not only polished performers but managed their own road bookings, created costumes, choreography and arranged music. According to Hall's professional biography (archived by dance critic Ann Barzel), the Dyerettes toured with Charlie Barnet in 1950, Louis Armstrong in 1951, Ray Charles in 1952, Sarah Vaughan in 1951, 1953, and 1960, Count Basie in 1951, 1953, and 1960, Dinah Washington in 1951, 1956, and 1963, Tito Puente in 1958, Duke Ellington in 1958, and Mel Tormé in 1959.

The Dyerettes performed in Harlem at the Apollo Theater Amateur Night in 1949, and from 1954 to 1958 the Dyerettes were "House Openers" for the revues and touring bands at the Apollo. While in New York the Hall studied with Charles Weidman and the Dyerettes were choreographed and styled by Cholly Atkins. Ebony magazine declared them "one of the top dancing groups in the country", but the Dyerettes ended their career as a national touring act in 1959 when Sammy Dyer became ill. Upon his death in 1960, Dyer left the school to Hall who renamed it the Sammy Dyer School of the Theatre.

=== 1960–1998: Dyer School of Theater and Bahamian National Dance Company ===
The Dyerettes ceased national touring (they occasionally did regional Midwest performances), but the group name lived on as the school billed itself as "Under the Direction of Shirley Bass and The Dyerettes". Hall and original Dyerette Muriel Foster helped run the school (Foster would eventually become the school's director). "We want to make the school a little memorial to Sammy Dyer," Hall told Ebony magazine in 1961. In tribute to Dyer, Hall developed a core group of female entertainers at the school called the Vashonettes (Vashon was Dyer's middle name). The group performed in nightclubs, toured with Sammy Davis Jr., performed in Mexico, and recorded for the Chess Records subsidiary Checker. There was a younger troupe of Junior Vashonettes, and the R&B group the On Coming Times was made up of former Vashonettes.

Dyer School alumni and instructors include Brill Barret (M.A.D.D. Rhythms), Kyle Davis (Ballets Jazz Montreal), Randy Duncan (Joel Hall Dance Company), Taylor Edwards (HipLet ballet), Savion Glover, Broadway choreographer Ted Louis Levy (Jelly's Last Jam), Charles McGregory (Houston Ballet), Nichelle Nichols, Idella Reed, Darryl Pandy, George "Mo Leggs" Patterson, Lauren Ridloff, and Jumanne Taylor. As of 2025, the school continues to train dancers at its location in the Harold Washington Cultural Center, on the former site of the Regal Theater, where the Dyerettes and Vashonettes performed.

The Dyerettes first visited the Bahamas in 1952 on a three-week tour, which included shows with Louis Armstrong, performing to full houses at the Zanzibar night club. Hall returned regularly, and she and her husband (Chess Records' executive Ralph Bass) honeymooned in the Bahamas following their 1960 wedding. By the mid-1960s they had built a second home in Nassau and Hall had immersed herself in Bahamian cultural education, practice, and diplomacy.

In 1966 Hall began working with the National Women's Council of the Bahamas, and in 1968 she established the Bahamas Dance Theatre in Nassau, combining her practices from the Dyer School with Bahamian rhythms and folk dances, drawing upon traditions practiced at the Junkanoo national festival. During this period she developed the Operational Cultural Exchange Program, with students in Chicago visiting Nassau, and Nassau youth coming to the Dyer School, producing shows featuring youth dancers from both countries. This program started in 1966 and continued, in some form, for over 30 years until Hall's death in 1998. In July 1973 the Bahamas became an independent nation, and Hall was one of the choreographers for the Bahamas Independence Extravaganza. From 1976 to 1990 she helped produce the Miss Bahamas Pageant. And in 1992 she helped establish the National Dance Company of the Bahamas, becoming its Managing Director in 1994.

== Personal life ==
On December 17, 1960, Hall married R&B record producer Ralph Bass, then the A&R Director for Chess Records, after a three-year engagement. Their romance and partnership was boldly conducted in public at a time when interracial marriages were still legally prohibited in many states in the US. Bass helped Hall run the Sammy Dyer School, and Hall consulted with Bass about Chess business, most prominently encouraging Chess to sign comedian Moms Mabley in 1960. The Vashonettes, Hall's mentees, released a single on Chess subsidiary Checker in 1968. In 1967, Chess Records' most famous location, 2120 South Michigan Avenue, became Bass' personal office and the home of Sammy Dyer School of Theater. Bass helped run the school while his wife worked in the Bahamas, and continued to maintain an office for writing his memoirs when the school moved to nearby 2411 South Michigan Avenue.
