= Ann Duquesnay =

American musical theatre actress, composer and lyricist

- Born: North Carolina
- Occupations: Actress; singer; composer; lyricist

Ann Duquesnay is an American musical theatre singer/actress, composer and lyricist. She is best known for Bring in 'da Noise, Bring in 'da Funk, which earned her a Tony Award and Grammy Award nomination.

== Early life ==
Ann Dusuqsnay was born in North Carolina. Duquesnay's parents were Southern sharecroppers who moved to Harlem when she was five years old. She converted to Catholicism as a child. Her formal music training began well after her stage years. She developed a passion for theatre, encouraged by director George C. Wolfe.

Duquesnay's Broadway debut was in the revue Blues in the Night in 1982 as a standby. Two years later, she played Glinda in a revival of The Wiz. She was next seen in Jelly's Last Jam as Gran Mimi and Ancestor. She was a replacement on Broadway in It Ain't Nothin But the Blues.

She toured extensively in the U.S. and internationally.She was critically acclaimed for her performance in roles as Alberta Hunter Cookin at the Cookery (Drama League Recognition Award and Drama Desk nominee); and Billie Holiday Lady Day" (Bay Area Critics Circle Award). Off-Broadway and Regional Sheila's Day at Hartford Stage, Crossroads Theatre, and Market Theatre, Johannesburg SA; Sammy Old Globe Theatre (NAACP Theatre Award nominee); revival of Hallelujah Baby Arena Stage (Helen Hayes Award); Our Leading Lady Manhattan Theatre Club (Audelco Award nominee); Spunk (NAACP Theatre Award) collaborated on music; Porgy & Bess (Maria) Houston Grand Opera & Japan tour; Ma Rainey's Black Bottom (Ma Rainey) Denver Centre Theatre. She has worked as a narrator in Ken Burns' documentaries and the biographical audio book of Aretha Franklin Aretha From These Roots.

Along with Daryl Waters and Zane Mark, Duquesnay co-wrote the music for Bring in 'Da Noise, Bring in 'Da Funk in 1996, as well as playing the roles of 'Da Singer and Chanteuse. The musical debuted on April 25. For her contributions, she won a Tony for Best Featured Actress in a Musical and was nominated for Best Original Score.

In 2006, Duquesnay returned to Broadway in the revue Hot Feet, featuring music by Maurice White.
