= Ayodele Casel =

American tap dancer (born 1975)

- Born: June 5, 1975 (age 51); Bronx, New York, U.S.
- Occupations: Tap dancer, choreographer
- Years active: 1997–present
- Website: www.ayodelecasel.com

Ayodele Casel (born June 5, 1975) is an American tap dancer and choreographer. Raised in Puerto Rico, she derived inspiration for her tap style from salsa music. She became the first and remains the only woman to be a member of Savion Glover's Not Your Ordinary Tappers.

== Early life and education ==
Ayodele Casel was born in the Bronx in New York City. Her parents were martial artist Tayari Casel and Aida Tirado. Ayodele moved to Rincon, Puerto Rico when she was in the 4th grade, returning to New York in 1990. In Puerto Rico, Casel listened to the music of Hector Lavoe, the El Gran Combo, and Celia Cruz. Their salsa music would influence her tap dance style. While in high school, Casel became "obsessed" with the films of Fred Astaire and Ginger Rogers. She also attended acting classes at the William Esper Studio.

As a young artist, Casel attended Mind-Builders Creative Arts Center and was a member of the Positive Youth Troupe (PYT). Casel attended the Tisch School of the Arts for acting. While at Tisch, in 1995, Casel began studying tap dance under Charles Goddertz. She also became friends with Baakari Wilder. During that time, Wilder was a principal dancer for Bring in 'da Noise, Bring in 'da Funk. Wilder taught Casel tap steps and she accompanied him to tap events at clubs in New York, where she would learn improvisation. She joined the New York Shakespeare Festival Institute of Tap. With the encouragement of Wilder, Casel started studying under Barbara Duffy. He also introduced her to Savion Glover, who would help Casel launch her career.

== Career ==
Glover saw Casel perform at the Nuyorican Poets Café. He invited Casel to perform in the opening credits for Monday Night Football in 1997. Shortly thereafter, Casel became the first woman to join Glover's Not Your Ordinary Tappers (NYOTs) group. She performed with NYOTs for two years, including at Carnegie Hall, the White House, and Radio City Music Hall.

She performed as a soloist in Imagine Tap. Casel left NYOTs in 1999. That year, she would launch her first solo show was !Ayo!, a Latin music themed performance, and would appear in the documentary Thou Swell, Thou Witty. She also performed in "Beauteez ‘N the Beat" that year. She performed in "The Art and Appreciation of Percussion" (2000), with the Jazz Tap Ensemble and in The Story of Tap: Sequel, both in 2005. In 2007, she performed in "Paddywack: A Tap Dance Concerto" at Lincoln Center.

In 2017 at Spoleto Festival USA, Casel performed the world premiere of her solo show While I Have The Floor. She was named one of the Biggest Breakout Stars of 2019 by The New York Times. In 2019-2020, Casel was the Frances B. Cashin Fellow at the Radcliffe Institute for Advanced Study. In 2021, Casel created Chasing Magic directed by her long-time collaborator Torya Beard. The show first premiered as a film as part of The Joyce virtual program, then as a stage show at the American Repertory Theater. It returned to The Joyce as a live show at 2022. The 2022 short documentary film (produced by Five Sisters Productions), Tapping Into Our Past, Tapping Into Our Future: Ayodele Casel tells the story of her development as an artist and her discovery of the Black women and men tap dancers who came before her. Also in 2022, Casel was the tap choreographer for the revival of Funny Girl on Broadway, which earned her a Drama Desk Award nomination.
