= Book of Numbers (disambiguation) =

The Book of Numbers is the fourth book in the Hebrew Torah and the Christian Bible.

Book of Numbers may also refer to:

- Book of Numbers (film), 1973 film
- Book of Numbers (novel), 2015 novel by Joshua Cohen
- A Book of Numbers, 1982 book by John Grant
- The Book of Numbers (math book), 1996 math book by John Horton Conway and Richard K. Guy

== See also ==
- Telephone directory, a book of phone numbers
- Numbers (disambiguation) § Literature
