= The Singing Angels =

Since 1964...

== History ==
The Singing Angels was founded in 1964 by Bill Boehm who wished to create a program that would bring children together to perform "good" music. Members of The Singing Angels come from 7+ Ohio counties in the greater Cleveland-Akron metropolitan area, United States, and are ambassadors representing the best in Northeast Ohio area musical youth. After the first holiday season, The Singing Angels were in demand all year round and performed at programs including church fund raisers and business conferences in downtown hotels. The Lakeside Summer Art Festival became an annual performance in 1965.

The group's first television special was made for Christmas 1967 at WEWS-TV and repeated in 1968. In 1969, the Angels had their first Command Performance at the White House. That Christmas, Wayne Newton introduced them to the nation on the Kraft Music Hall Special on NBC. The Singing Angels’ first international tour was to Romania in 1974.

The first rehearsal hall was in the Statler Hotel, followed by the old downtown Cleveland YMCA. In 1970, the Angels made the Cleveland Fire Training Academy their musical home. Today, they rehearse in the Cleveland Masonic Temple.

The Angels have sung in over 30 foreign countries, starting with their first official tour to Romania. Subsequent tours included China in 1983, where the Angels sang at the Great Wall of China. This was in an era when United States visitors were strictly prohibited in the communist country. In July 2000 the Angels were the sole representatives of the United States at the World Fair Expo 2000, held in Hanover, Germany. The Singing Angels' signature song "Let There Be Peace On Earth" was heard in several pavilions hosted by other nations.

The Singing Angels have been featured on national and international television, have performed four times at the White House and have appeared in concert with a host of superstars, including Bob Hope, Kenny Rogers, Wayne Newton, Celine Dion, B.J. Thomas, Roberta Flack, Eartha Kitt, Cathy Rigby, the U.S. Army Band, and the world-renowned Cleveland Orchestra.

Their 1973 single, "Christmas Is Christmas All Over The World", is one of the songs selected for the classic Yule Log Christmas special originally aired by WPIX-TV in New York.

=== Founder ===
William C. (Bill) Boehm, Founding Director, started the Singing Angels in 1964 to promote the action and joy of singing good music particularly amongst children. He held a master's degree in Dramatic Arts from Western Reserve University. Bill was the first staging director of Cleveland Music Carnival Arena theatre, starring in Herman Pirchner's Alpine Village, and had more than 5,000 personal stage appearances. Other highlights of Bill's career have included appearances as soloist with the Cleveland Symphony "Pops" Concerts; Singing Star of Chicago Theatre of the Air and tenor lead in the NBC-TV production of "Macbeth". In 1977, he was awarded the Ohio State Governor's Award "for excellence of achievement benefiting mankind and improving the quality of life for all Ohioans." Bill was a Captain in the Infantry in World War II and is a past President of the Rotary Club of Cleveland.

He sat on the committee that, with the help of non-profit consultants, forged the group's Long Range Strategic Plan, approved by the Board of Directors in November 2002. A ceremony during the Spring Benefit Concert featured alumni from each decade of the group paying tributes to him. The group has created The Singing Angels William C. Boehm Endowment Fund to provide long-term funding so that future generations of young people can benefit from his vision. Boehm died in April 2017.

=== Recordings ===
2015 Candy Cane Lane
2009 The Singing Angels: Unplugged
2005 Somewhere in My Memory - 40 Years of Holidays with the Singing Angels
2004 Walking on Sunshine
2001 God Bless the USA
2000 Happiness
1998 We Wish You the Merriest
1993 And The Angels Sing
1987 Getting Ready for Christmas
1984 Make Someone Happy
1983 Jolly, Holly Days
1981 Christmas in the Air
1981 Get Happy
1980 Children of the World
1979 Great Day
1977 Finally It’s Christmas
1976 Sing America
1974 Tenth Anniversary
1973 Christmas Is Christmas All Over The World (single)
1972 Bill Boehm’s Singing Angels

== Alumni ==
Laura Fedor continues to pursue her musical dreams and was a contestant on NBC's Nashville Star with her best friend Sophie. She is currently on Teddy Gentry's Best New Nashville CD, available at Cracker Barrel restaurants.

Mark Glinka of The Singing Angels has also made a career in music as a bassist and vocalist with rock bands 28 North and Threads of Scarlet.

Daryl Waters (former Singing Angels youth pianist) won a 2010 Tony Award for Best Orchestrations for Memphis and was nominated for a 1996 Tony Award for Best Original Score for Bring in 'Da Noise, Bring in 'Da Funk.

Kenny Pengal of the Singing Angels was a contestant on The Voice, as "Kenny P" on Team Gwen (Stefani).
