= Derick K. Grant =

American tap dancer and choreographer (born 1973)

Derick K. Grant (born May 19, 1973) is an African-American tap dancer and choreographer. He came to prominence in 1996, as an original company member and Dance Captain in the George C. Wolfe-produced musical Bring in 'Da Noise, Bring in 'Da Funk at both The Joseph Papp Public Theater/New York Shakespeare Festival and on Broadway. Derick recreated Savion Glover's choreography and starred in the role of 'da beat for the first National Tour. He works all around the world for different tap shows and events such as "Tap To You". In 2009, he appeared on the sixth season of the hit show So You Think You Can Dance where he choreographed a tap routine performed by the three tap dancers in that season's Top 20: Peter Sabasino, Bianca Revels, and Phillip Attmore. He lives in New York City with his son, daughter, and wife.

== Training ==
Born in Boston, Massachusetts, Grant began his training at the age of two at The Roxbury Center for the Performing Arts, and by the time he was eight years old, he had learned the "hoofin" style of tap from the master tap dancer Dianne Walker. Derick furthered his training in Los Angeles at Universal Dance Design Studio under the tutelage of Paul Kennedy. Derick spent three years with the Jazz Tap Ensemble touring the world.

== Awards and career highlights ==
He is the recipient of the Princess Grace Award for Upcoming Young Artists as well as The Helen Hayes Award (Washington D.C.) for Outstanding Featured Actor for his role in 'Bring in ’Da Noise, Bring in ’Da Funk.' Derick was featured at The Kennedy Center for the Performing Arts African Odyssey program, part of the Expresiones Latinas Festival. He collaborated on a piece that incorporated tap and capoeira with renowned Brazilian artist Nego Gato, which opened the festivities for singer Daniella Mercury. He also choreographed and performed in a piece on the history of tap that launched the Black History Month 2001 celebration at Aaron Davis Hall. Recent compositions were featured in The Queens Symphony Opera’s Duke Ellington Concert in Ann Arbor's Arts Festival.

Most recently Derick's own creation, A Night Out: Tap! toured the country for three months. Of his latest choreography and performance with Jazz Tap Ensemble at the Joyce Theater in NYC, The New York Times said, "Mr. Grant let gusts of rhythm propel him with remarkable velocity!"

Derick's current project as of this writing is a musical revue entitled Imagine Tap!.
