= Dorrance Dance =

American dance troupe

- Type: Dance troupe
- Founded: 2010 or 2011
- Founder: Michelle Dorrance
- Headquarters: New York City, United States
- Website: dorrancedance.com

Dorrance Dance is an American dance troupe founded by dancer Michelle Dorrance in 2011.

Its debut performance was on a shared evening with Dormeshia Sumbry-Edwards at Danspace Project, for which the company received a Bessie Award for "blasting open our notions about tap." Dorrance has since choreographed three evening-length works for the company: SOUNDspace (2012), The Blues Project (2013, a collaboration with Derick Grant, Toshi Reagon and Dormeshia Sumbry-Edwards), and ETM: The Initial Approach (2014), a collaboration with Nicholas Van Young).

Their 2024 production of The Nutcracker received favorable reviews.

== White House controversy ==
In December 2023, the Dorrance Dance performed a staging of The Nutcracker inside the White House, under President Joe Biden's administration. The performance was controversial, but The New York Times commented that "it was shocking to see something as innocuous as The Nutcracker stir up such outrage."
