= Toni-Leslie James =

American costume designer

Toni-Leslie James is an American costume designer for stage, television and film. James was awarded The Irene Sharaff Young Masters Award and the 2009 Obie Award for Sustained Excellence in Costume Design. She received a BA in costume design from The Ohio State University. James was an associate professor and head of design in the theatre department of Virginia Commonwealth University for 12 years, and is currently an assistant professor of design and Yale Repertory Theatre resident costume designer for the Yale School of Drama.

Her Broadway costume design credits include the costume designs for Bernhardt/Hamlet (2019 Drama Desk Award, 2018 Tony Award nomination), Come from Away (2017 Drama Desk nomination), the 2017 revival of August Wilson's Jitney (2017 Tony Award nomination, 2017 Drama Desk nomination), Amazing Grace (Hewes Design Award nomination), The Scottsboro Boys (Hewes Design Award nomination), Finian's Rainbow, Chita Rivera: The Dancer's Life, Ma Rainey's Black Bottom, King Hedley II, One Mo’ Time, The Wild Party (FANY Award), Marie Christine (FANY nomination), Footloose, The Tempest (Drama Desk nomination), Twilight: Los Angeles, 1992, Angels in America, Chronicle of a Death Foretold, and Jelly's Last Jam (Hewes Design Award, Tony Award nomination, Drama Desk nomination).

Off Broadway and regionally she has designed various productions, including for the City Center Encores! series, Lincoln Center Theater, The Public Theatre, The Vineyard Theatre, Second Stage, Playwrights Horizons, Arena Stage, The Shakespeare Theatre, The Mark Taper Forum, Ballet Hispanico, and internationally at the Royal Court and Chitchester theaters in England, The Citadel Theatre in Canada, and The Greek Festival in Athens, Greece.

Her television credits include Whoopi for NBC, As the World Turns for CBS, The Huey P. Newton Story directed by Spike Lee, five specials for WNET/13 Great Performances series and the feature film A Tale of Two Pizzas directed by Vincent Sassone.
