= Chloe Arnold =

American dancer

Chloe Arnold is an American dancer and Emmy-nominated choreographer, actress, director, and producer. She is best known internationally as a tap dancer, and was seen on Season 11 of FOX's So You Think You Can Dance with her company Chloe Arnold's Syncopated Ladies.

== Early life ==
Arnold was born in Washington, D.C. She did her first modeling work at age 4 for PM magazine, and began dancing at age 6. At 12, she starred in Chloe's World, a documentary for cable television. She was a member of Chris Bellou's National Tap Ensemble from age 10 to 13; then Toni Lombre's Taps & Company from 13 to 18, where she trained in tap, ballet, jazz, and modern. In high school, she won a gold medal from The Montgomery County NAACP's Act-so Arts Competition. She played violin in the DC Youth Orchestra, and played varsity sports at Wheaton High School in soccer, tennis, track and field, and cross country. She also excelled as a scholar, winning The Bill Gates Millennium Scholarship, The Project Excellence Award, and the Toyota Scholars Award. She trained in New York City in tap dance with Jason Samuels Smith, Baakari Wilder, Ted Levy, and Savion Glover, and also trained in ballet, jazz, hip hop, salsa, and African dance. She studied acting at The New York Film School, Bill Duke's Actor's Boot Camp, and Debbie Allen's Uta Hagen-based acting class.

== Career ==
As co-founder of the DC Tap Festival, Arnold began her professional career at age 10 in Savion Glover's Washington, D.C. Crew performing at The Dance Place, The Kennedy Center in Savion Glover's All Star Tap Revue (starring Gregory Hines, The Nicholas Brothers, and Jimmy Slyde), and in Frank Hatchet's Broadway Showcase. At 16, she was cast in Debbie Allen's production of Brother's of the Knight at The Kennedy Center. She has continued to work with Allen for over a decade as a performer, choreographer, director, and producer.

Arnold and her company All-Female Tap Dance Band won the first Crew Battle on FOX's So You Think You Can Dance with Chloe Arnold's Syncopated Ladies. She also released a Tap Dance Salute to Beyoncé. When Beyoncé posted the video on social media, it drew millions of views. Some of Arnold's other recent credits include a recurring role on HBO's hit series Boardwalk Empire as one of the Onyx Girls; performing at Madison Square Garden for the opening of the NY Knicks 2013-2014 season; working with Beyoncé on the 2013 Pepsi and H&M campaigns, and many music videos; guest-performing on NBC's America's Got Talent, ABC's Dancing with the Stars and FOX's So You Think You Can Dance; Make Your Move 3D, a highly anticipated dance feature film; a sold-out NY run of her one-woman show My Life. My Diary. My Dance. at La MaMa in New York City; the Global Fusion Concert in Dubai with ten of the world's most accomplished musicians; and performing with Chloé's Syncopated Ladies at the star-studded "One Night Only" Homecoming Gala Concert Cabaret at the Howard Theatre in Washington, D.C. Some of her other stage credits are Emmy Award winning choreographer Jason Samuels Smith's critically acclaimed Charlie's Angels: A Tribute To Charlie Parker, co-starred with Tichina Arnold and Robert Torti in Debbie Allen's Alex in Wonderland at the Kennedy Center and Frued Playhouse, and performed in the modern tap musical Imagine Tap. She also choreographed and starred in the 2008 live television opening number of the Jerry Lewis MDA Telethon that raised $65 million for the Muscular Dystrophy Association. Arnold has guest starred and choreographed in other television shows appearances like Nickelodeon's The Brothers Garcia, Discovery Channel's Time Warp, the CW's One on One, and UPN's The Parkers. Arnold's other film credits include HBO and Universal Pictures Outkast's feature film Idlewild and Dean Hargrove's award-winning short film Tap Heat.

As a tap dance soloist, Arnold has performed in over 21 countries and 35 states including the Stockholm Tap Festival, Taipei Tap Festival, Melbourne International Tap Festival, Tap Reloaded – Stuttgart, Tap In Rio, Tap Into A Cure – Edmonton, Alberta, Canada, Brazilian International Tap Festival, Maui Tap Experience, Uberlandia Tap Festival, Tap City – NYC, Chicago Human Rhythm Project, Sole to Soul – Austin, North Carolina Rhythm Tap Festival, Philly Tap Challenge, L.A. Tap Festival, and DC Tap Festival. As a member of Jason Samuels Smith's Anybody Can Get It, she has performed at City Center's Fall for Dance, Sadlers Wells in London, Jacob's Pillow, The Getty Museum, Coca, and the Museum of Contemporary Art, Chicago.

Although she was accepted by Harvard University, Arnold decided to attend Columbia University to study theater, film, and dance in New York City. During her years at Columbia, she performed professionally in Debbie Allen's "Soul Possessed" at The Kennedy Center and The Alliance Theater; co-starred in Jason Samuels Smith's T.A.A.P in New York City; and was a featured dancer in the AMC TV series Cool Women. She also taught at The Broadway Dance Center and spent summers teaching dance at P. Diddy's Summer Camp Texas and The Debbie Allen Dance Institute and Academy in Los Angeles.

Graduating from Columbia University with a degree in film studies in 2002, Arnold's directing education continued by shadowing television director Debbie Allen. Arnold was the second-unit director on music videos for acclaimed director Melina: Eve's Tambourine, Kylie Minogue's Wow, and Lloyd Banks feat. Keri Hilson's Help. She also directed Cuerpaso, fitness video and pilot, the "I Love Tap" Instructional DVD, and music videos for independent artists Choclatt and Tess.

== Other ventures ==
In 2009, Arnold launched her production company Chloe & Maud Productions with her younger sister Maud, and released her instructional DVD. She also has a clothing line, Chloe's Tap Couture - I Love Tap.

== Performer credits ==
=== Film ===
Make Your Move 3D - (2014)
Idlewild - Tap Dancer (2005)
Tap Heat - Tap Dancer (2004)
Tap World, A Feature-Length Documentary - (2015)

=== Television ===
So You Think You Can Dance Season 11 - Winner of Dance Crew Battle (Chloe Arnold's Syncopated Ladies)
Boardwalk Empire - Recurring role as one of the Onyx Girls
Dancing With The Stars - Guest performer with Josh Johnson - AT&T Spotlight Performance
America's Got Talent - Guest performer
So You Think You Can Dance Season 8 - Guest performer with Jason Samuels Smith's Anybody Can Get It
Jerry Lewis MDA Telethon (Opening Number 2003)
Time Warp
The Parkers
One on One - Cabin Fever
Brothers Garcia - Two Left Feet
Cool Women - AMC Docuseries
Secret Talents of The Stars

=== Theater ===
Charlie's Angels: A Tribute To Charlie Parker
Alex In Wonderland, Co-Star w/Robert Torti, Tichina Arnold
Imagine Tap, Harris Theater in Chicago – 2005
Brothers of The Knight
Soul Possessed
Thank You Gregory
Charlie's Angels Tap City, LA Tap Festival, Chicago Human Rhythm
Tap Roots, Jazz Tap Ensemble @ The Joyce Theater
Sammy The Musical – Life of Sammy Davis Jr.
National Tour - The Legacy of Cab Calloway Concert
Josephine Baker: A Century in the Spotlight 2006 Barnard
Oct. 2008 – India Jazz Progressions
New York Tap Experience – F.I.T. 2009
Dance Magazine Awards – 2009
Dallas Dance council National Tap Dance Day
We are Lights – White Plains Performing Arts Center
The Oneness Awards – Honoring Michael Jackson
Oberlin Hip Hop Conference on line-up with Talib Kweli and Common
Festivals: "Tap City" – New York City
Chicago Human Rhythm Project 2005, 2009
Los Angeles Tap Festival
Soul to Sole Festival – Austin Texas June 2006
Brazilian International Festival – São Paulo, BR Fall 2005, 2006, 2007
Uberlandia Tap Festival – Minas Gerais, BR May 2009
Rio Tap Festival – Rio de Janeiro Jan, 2009
Melbourne International Tap Festival – Australia 2008
Tap Reloaded – Stuttgart, Germany April 2009
Tap Into a Cure – Edmonton, Canada August 2008
Black Choreographers Festival – San Francisco Feb. 2006, 2007, 2008
DC Tap Festival – 2010 – Founder and Co-director
Taipei Tap Festival, Tap Together – Taiwan 2009
North Carolina Rhythm Tap Festival – June 2009
Maui Tap Experience – 2007, 2008
Philly Tap Challenge – June 2008, 2009
Tradition In Tap – Skip Cunningham May 2009
Women in Tap, UCLA 2007
Anybody Can Get It –
Saddlers Wells – London Feb. 1997
The Getty – Los Angeles
Los Angeles Tap Festival – 2003–2009
COCA – Center of Creative Arts, St. Louis November 2009
Fall for Dance, City Center October 2006
Jacob's Pillow July 2009
Museum of Contemporary Art Chicago

== Choreographer ==
Television
The Late Late Show with James Corden - earned first Emmy nomination 2018
Macy's National Commercial
HBO's The Comeback
Jerry Lewis Telethon (opening number)
The Parkers
One on One
The Brothers Garcia
Associate Choreographer - ABC American Celebration
Assistant Choreographer - Secret talent of the Stars

Film
Tap Dreams, Tokyo in production
Spirited (2022)

Theater
Alex In Wonderland Associate Choreographer
Pearl Associate Choreographer
Thank you Gregory
Tap City, NYC
L.A Tap Festival
Scripps College 2008
E-moves Harlem Stage @ Aaron Davis Hall 2008
Take It to The Stage

Producer
Cuerpaso Fitness DVD
I Love Tap Instructional DVD
In House Producer for the Debbie Allen Dance Academy
Pepito's Story at the Wadsworth Theater
Henry Mancini Christmas Show – Disney Hall, LA
Dreams – The Freud Playhouse
Dancing In The Wings, Freud Playhouse
Debbie Allen Dance Academy Hip Hop Dance Intensive
Debbie Allen Dance Academy Los Angeles Tap Festival 2003 - 2006

Director
2nd unit music videos Director Melina
Lloyd Banks - Help
Kylie Minogue - Wow
Eve - Tambourine
Independent Music Videos for Choclatt, Tess
Cuerpaso Fitness DVD and TV Pilot
Co-director of Los Angeles Tap Festival
Director of the DC Tap Festival
Co-director of Take It To The Stage
I Love Tap Instructional DVD
