= Ted Louis Levy =

American tap dancer (born 1960)

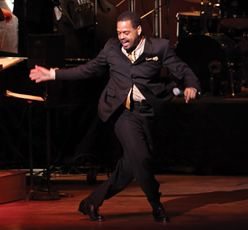
Ted Louis Levy in performance

Ted Louis Levy (born April 25, 1960) is an American tap dancer, singer, choreographer, and director. He is widely celebrated as one of America’s premier tap dance artists.

== Early life ==
Levy was born in 1960 in Chicago, Illinois. His mother, Dolly, was a chorus dancer at the Club DeLisa on the South Side.

From 1980 to 1984, Levy served in the United States Navy.

== Career & Awards ==
In 1985, Levy began his performing career in the Chicago production of Shoot Me While I'm Happy at the Victory Gardens Theater. In 1989, he debuted on Broadway in the musical Black and Blue.

In 1988, Levy was a member of the Kuumba Theatre Ensemble whose performance in Precious Memories: Strolling 47th Street on PBS won a Chicago Emmy Award for outstanding performance.

Levy’s production of Ted Levy and Friends in 1992 confirmed "the rebirth of tap dancing as an art form", according to a review in The New York Times. Levy’s performing “friends” included Gregory Hines, Savion Glover, and Jimmy Slyde, among others.

Jelly’s Last Jam, choreographed by Hope Clarke and with tap choreography by Gregory Hines and Levy, earned the trio Tony Award and Drama Desk Award nominations in 1992 and an Outer Critics Circle Award win in 1993.

In 1994, Levy directed Savion Glover’s Dancing Under the Stars at the New York Shakespeare Festival's Delacorte Theater. This led to his direction of the 1995 workshop production of Glover in Bring in ‘da Noise, Bring in ‘da Funk, which moved to Broadway in 1996.

Levy was nominated for an NAACP Image Award in 2000 for his role in Rollin' On The T.O.B.A.

In 2001, Levy appeared in the movie Bojangles with Gregory Hines, and returned to Broadway as Papa Jack in Susan Stroman & Harry Connick Jr.’s Thou Shalt Not.

For a Supporting Actor role in Hot Mikado, Levy won a Helen Hayes Award in 2003 and was nominated for Jeff Awards in 2003 and 2011. Levy was nominated for an additional Jeff Award for Supporting Actor in 2012 for his role in My One and Only.

In 2015, Levy appeared in the film documentary, Tap World, directed by Dean Hargrove.

Levy received dual 2018 Big Easy Award nominations for a revival of Jelly's Last Jam in New Orleans: "Choreography" (with Traci Tolmaire) and "Best Lead Actor in a Musical".

In 2018, in addition to performing, Levy is developing a new production, The Last Swingin’ Black Jew.
