= Edward Lawrence Levy (fraudster) =

British fraudulent solicitor

Edward Lawrence Levy (c. 1826 – 20 October 1892) was a British solicitor convicted of forgery, fraud and perjury. Along with two of his sons, he was the subject of an entire editorial article in The Times in 1882, which summarized their "organized system of fraud and perjury". He went to prison three times and died in Wormwood Scrubs five months into his third sentence.

== Biography ==
Levy was born in London, the eldest child of Lawrence Levy (c.1803–1873) and Rebecca Jacobs (c.1804–1874). His father was a sheriff's officer, bill discounter, wine merchant and owner and manager of theatres. Levy qualified as a solicitor in 1848 after serving as an articled clerk to his uncle, Charles Lewis (c.1801–1864). He married his first cousin, Charlotte Levy (1828–1891), at the Great Synagogue, London, on 28 August 1850.

== Career and criminal activity ==
Levy initially practised with his brother, David Lawrence Levy, but the partnership ended when David left for Australia (later to become a prominent Sydney solicitor) and Levy was made bankrupt.

In 1864, Levy's uncle, Charles Lewis, under whom he had served as an articled clerk, unsuccessfully attempted to have him struck off the Rolls of Court for unprofessional practices relating to costs and witnesses' expenses.

In 1866, a warrant was issued for Levy's arrest for forging a bill of exchange, but he went abroad and the police were unable to find him until 1870 when he was discovered living in Liverpool under the assumed name of Edward Lingden. He was tried for deception and forgery at the Old Bailey in July 1870, but acquitted on the ground that the jury believed he had sufficient authority to use the name of the drawer of the bill.

In 1875, the Court of Queen's Bench, considered a report detailing further malpractices with witnesses, fees and other matters by Levy and two co-conspirators. For example, in one case involving a compensation claim from a railway company, they recovered £600 in costs and damages, but paid out only half of this to their client. The report made clear that Levy was the main person behind these schemes and he was struck off the Rolls of Court.

Also in 1875, Levy was accused of bribing witnesses to commit perjury in an injury compensation claim against the London General Omnibus Company, but he again escaped conviction. A further unsuccessful attempt to prosecute Levy for perjury was made in 1876 by a solicitor called James Grayson. Grayson had to plead guilty to unlawfully publishing a libel upon Levy.

Levy then found himself a position as clerk to a solicitor called Fisher, who left him almost entirely in charge of running his practice. In April and May 1879, Levy was again tried twice for deception and forgery at the Old Bailey. In the first trial, he was accused of endorsing a cheque for £121, recovered from a debtor on behalf of a client, into his own personal account. Levy was acquitted when he produced a document which appeared to authorize him to sign the name of the client. In the second trial he was accused of a similar act of forgery relating to a cheque for £29 for different client. This time he was found guilty and sentenced to eighteen months' hard labour.

After his release, Levy was again charged at the Old Bailey in December 1882, along with his sons Daniel and Henry, for conspiracy to pervert the course of justice. Levy had found another complicit solicitor, Micklethwaite, who again allowed him to carry out his own business in the firm's name. In essence they had been acting as injury lawyers representing individuals claiming compensation from railway and tram companies for accident injuries. They supplied supporting false witnesses who had been paid and tutored to commit perjury. Two other collaborators called Kingswell and Brown helped concoct the stories and sought out suitable accident cases. The Levys and their collaborators were found guilty. Edward Lawrence Levy and Kingswell each received five years' penal servitude, Brown two years' hard labour, and Daniel and Henry Levy each eighteen months' hard labour.

The Times considered the Levys' "organized system of fraud and perjury" at length in an editorial/leader article of 22 December 1882, implying they must have been involved in many other similar cases that had not come to light, and suggesting that the sentences handed to Levy and his sons were unduly lenient.

Levy was tried yet again at the Old Bailey in May 1892, under the name of Edward Lewis, and received a third prison sentence for receiving stolen goods. He had set up a business lending small sums of money, and had induced a young debtor named Brett to steal furnishing materials from his employer in order to meet his repayments. It was said the furnishings were for Levy's own use because his household effects were badly in need of refurbishment. Levy was sentenced to a further five years' penal servitude.

At the end of his life, he had sunk to lending small sums of just a few pounds, preying on the young and naive, and receiving stolen goods of low value which he needed because of his own reduced circumstances. He died in Wormwood Scrubs just five months later, on 20 October 1892, leaving £275.
