= A Book of Numbers =

1982 book by John Grant

A Book of Numbers (ISBN 0906798191) is a book by John Grant published in 1982 by Ashgrove Press of Bath.

== Contents ==
A Book of Numbers is a book of information relating to numbers, arranged in order numerically.

== Reception ==
Dave Langford reviewed A Book of Numbers for White Dwarf #39, and stated that "So you find the legend of the Seven Sleepers of Ephesus amid 12 pages of entries for mystical 7; under 90 is Theodore Sturgeon's famous law '90% of everything is rubbish'; the 159 entry records the 159 SF/fantasy titles hacked out in 13 years by notorious Lionel Fanthorpe; and so on. Enormous fun."
