= Imagine Tap =

Imagine Tap!
- Music: Zane Mark
- Productions: 2006 Chicago

Imagine Tap! is a musical revue developed by Derick K. Grant (director/choreographer), Zane Mark (music director/supervisor), Aaron Tolson (associate choreographer/co-creator/asst producer), and Channing Cook Holmes (assistant music director). It opened at the Harris Theater for Music and Dance in Chicago, IL on July 11, 2006, and closed on August 6, 2006.

It is one of the few big-budget all-tap dance revues since Bring in 'da Noise/Bring in 'da Funk, of which Derick K. Grant was dance captain for the original Broadway cast.

== List of songs ==
All original music is by Zane Mark and Crystal Joy.

1. Imagine Tap
2. Echoes
3. 3 Chefs
4. Mr. Happy
5. Beautiful Love
6. Tea 4 Two
7. The Doll
8. Tea 4 Two [B]
9. Detention
10. Dance Like David
11. Tu Eres Loco
12. Subway Heat
13. Samurai Shuffle
14. Battle of the Beats
15. Old Friends
16. Imagine Tap (reprise)
