= Spunk (play) =

1989 play by George C. Wolfe

- Original language: English
- Written by: George C. Wolfe

Premiere
- Date: 1989

Spunk is a play by American playwright George C. Wolfe. The play is an adaptation of three stories by Zora Neale Hurston: "Sweat", "Story in Harlem Slang" and "The Gilded Six Bits". Wolfe won a 1989 Obie award for best off-Broadway director for Spunk.
