= George C. Wolfe =

American director, playwright, and producer (born 1954)

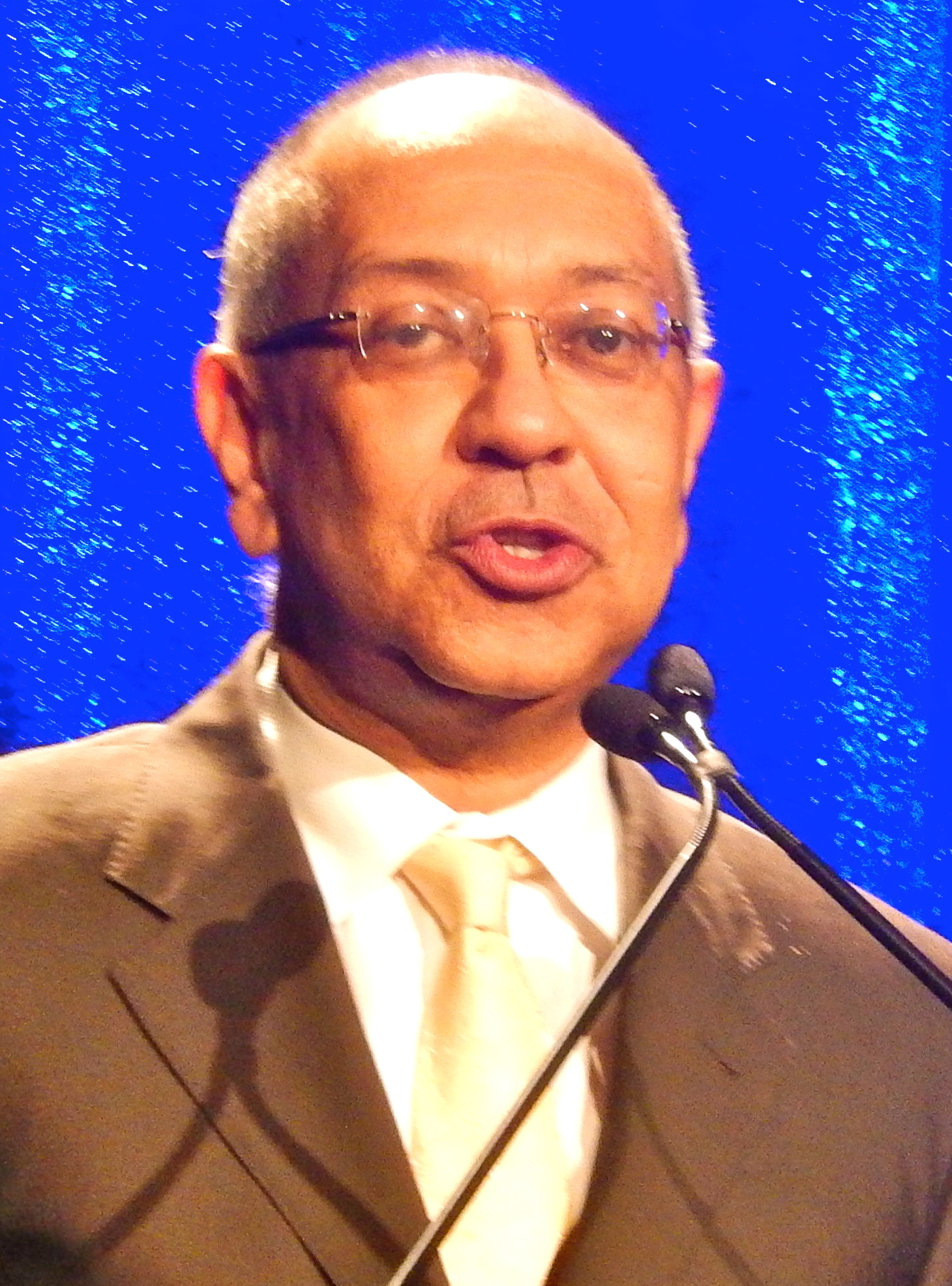
- Wolfe in 2013
- Born: George Costello Wolfe; September 23, 1954 (age 72); Frankfort, Kentucky, U.S.
- Education: Kentucky State University; Pomona College (BA); New York University (MFA)
- Occupations: stage and screen director • playwright • producer
- Awards: Full list

George Costello Wolfe (born September 23, 1954) is an American stage and screen director, playwright and producer. His accolades include two Tony Awards for directing the play Angels in America: Millennium Approaches and the musical Bring in 'da Noise/Bring in 'da Funk. He served as artistic director of The Public Theater from 1993 until 2004.

== Early life and education ==
Wolfe was born into an African-American family in Frankfort, Kentucky, the son of Anna (née Lindsey), an educator, and Costello Wolfe, a government clerk. He attended an all-black public school (a Rosenwald school) where his mother taught. He is interviewed in the documentary film Rosenwald, discussing his time at the school. After a family move, he began attending the integrated Frankfort public schools.

Wolfe attended Frankfort High School where he began to pursue his interest in the theatre arts, and wrote poetry and prose for the school's literary journal. After high school, Wolfe enrolled at Kentucky State University, a historically black college and the alma mater of his parents. Following his first year, he transferred to Pomona College in Claremont, California, where he pursued a BA in theater. Wolfe taught for several years in Los Angeles at the Inner City Cultural Center.

He moved to the East Coast and taught in New York City. In 1983, he earned an MFA in dramatic writing and musical theater at New York University.

== Career ==
In 1977, Wolfe gave C. Bernard Jackson, the executive director of the Inner City Cultural Center in the Los Angeles, the first scene of a play he was working on. Rather than suggest that he finish writing it, Jackson said, "Here's some money, go do it." The name of the play was Tribal Rites, or The Coming of the Great God-bird Nabuku to the Age of Horace Lee Lizer. Wolfe stated in an article he wrote about Jackson for the Los Angeles Times that "this production was perhaps the most crucial to my evolution" as an artist.

Among Wolfe's first major offerings—the musical Paradise (1985) and his play The Colored Museum (1986)—were off-Broadway productions that met with mixed reviews. In 1990, however, Wolfe won an Obie Award for a best off-Broadway director for his play Spunk, an adaptation of three stories by Zora Neale Hurston.

Wolfe gained a national reputation with his 1991 musical Jelly's Last Jam, a musical about the life of jazz musician Jelly Roll Morton. After a Los Angeles opening, the play moved to Broadway, where it received 11 Tony nominations and won the Drama Desk Award for Outstanding Book of a Musical. Two years later, Wolfe directed Tony Kushner's Angels in America: Millennium Approaches to great critical acclaim, and won a Tony Award. Wolfe also directed the world premiere of the second part of Angels, entitled Perestroika, the following year.

From 1993 to 2004, Wolfe served as artistic director and producer of the New York Shakespeare Festival/Public Theater. In 1996 he created the musical Bring in 'Da Noise, Bring in 'Da Funk, an ensemble of tap and music starring Savion Glover; the show moved to Broadway's Ambassador Theatre. His work won a second Tony Award for direction and was an enormous financial success.

In 2000, Wolfe co-wrote the book and directed the Broadway production of the musical The Wild Party.

In late 2004, Wolfe announced his intention to leave the theater for film direction, beginning with the well-received HBO film Lackawanna Blues.

Wolfe has also continued to direct plays, such as Suzan-Lori Parks' Pulitzer Prize-winning play Topdog/Underdog (2001), and Tony Kushner's Caroline, or Change (2003), a through-composed musical. In the summer of 2006, Wolfe directed a new translation of Bertolt Brecht's Mother Courage and Her Children at the time Delacorte Theatre in Central Park, starring Meryl Streep, Kevin Kline, and Austin Pendleton.

Wolfe directed the film Nights in Rodanthe, starring Richard Gere and Diane Lane, which opened in theaters in September 2008.

Wolfe is bringing his artistic talent to the design of the upcoming Center for Civil & Human Rights in Atlanta as its new chief creative officer.

In 2013, he was inducted into the American Theater Hall of Fame.

In August 2017, Wolfe was the only one of the 17 private members of the President's Committee on the Arts and Humanities who did not sign on to a letter of mass resignation in the wake of Donald Trump's remarks on the Unite the Right rally incident in Charlottesville, Virginia. However, his representatives stated that he, too, would be resigning and would add his name to the letter.

Wolfe directed a Broadway revival of Eugene O'Neill's The Iceman Cometh in 2018, with Denzel Washington starring as Hickey. The production played at the Jacobs Theatre for 14 weeks and began regular performances April 26.

Wolfe is openly gay. In 2022, he was featured in the book 50 Key Figures in Queer US Theatre, with a profile written by theatre scholar Charles I. Nero.

== Works ==
=== Theater ===
Year	Title	Credit	Venue
1986	The Colored Museum	Writer	Crossroads Theatre
1992	Jelly's Last Jam	Director, writer (book)	Virginia Theatre
1993	Angels in America	Director, producer	Walter Kerr Theatre
1994	Twilight: Los Angeles, 1992	Director, producer	Cort Theatre
1995	The Tempest	Director, producer	Broadhurst Theatre
1996	Bring in 'da Noise, Bring in 'da Funk	Director, producer, lyrics, concept	Ambassador Theatre
1998	Golden Child	Producer	Longacre Theatre
1998	On the Town	Director, producer	Gershwin Theatre
2000	The Ride Down Mt. Morgan	Producer	Ambassador Theatre
2000	The Wild Party	Director, producer, writer (book)	Virginia Theatre
2002	Elaine Stritch at Liberty	Director, producer	Neil Simon Theatre
2002	Topdog/Underdog	Director, producer	Ambassador Theatre
2003	Take Me Out	Producer	Walter Kerr Theatre
2004	Caroline, or Change	Director, producer	Eugene O'Neill Theatre
2006	Mother Courage and Her Children	Director	Delacorte Theater
2011	The Normal Heart	Director	John Golden Theatre
2013	Lucky Guy	Director	Broadhurst Theatre
2016	Shuffle Along	Director, writer (book)	Music Box Theatre
2018	The Iceman Cometh	Director	Bernard B. Jacobs Theatre
2019	Gary: A Sequel to Titus Andronicus	Director	Booth Theatre
2024	Gypsy	Director	Majestic Theatre

=== Filmography ===
Year	Title	Credit	Role
1989	Trying Times	Writer (1 episode)	—
1993	Fires in the Mirror	Director	—
1994	Fresh Kill	Actor	Othello Yellow
2004	Garden State	Actor	Restaurant Manager
2005	Lackawanna Blues	Director	—
2006	The Devil Wears Prada	Actor	Paul
2008	Nights in Rodanthe	Director	—
2014	You're Not You	Director	—
2017	The Immortal Life of Henrietta Lacks	Director, writer	—
2019	She's Gotta Have It	Actor	Himself
2020	Ma Rainey's Black Bottom	Director	—
2023	Rustin	Director, producer	—
2026	The Devil Wears Prada 2	Actor	Paul

Directed Academy Award performances
Under Wolfe's direction, these actors have received Academy Award nominations for their performances in their respective roles.

Year	Performer	Film	Result
Academy Award for Best Actor
2020	Chadwick Boseman	Ma Rainey's Black Bottom	Nominated
2023	Colman Domingo	Rustin	Nominated
Academy Award for Best Actress
2020	Viola Davis	Ma Rainey's Black Bottom	Nominated

== See also ==
- African-American Tony nominees and winners
