= Ted Levy =

Australian rugby league footballer

Edward 'Ted' Levy (19 September 1922 – 24 July 2015) was a professional rugby league footballer in the Australian competition the New South Wales Rugby League (NSWRL).

Levy played for the Eastern Suburbs club in the years 1947 and 1948.
