= Jelly's Last Jam =

1991 musical about Jelly Roll Morton

- Original Broadway Promotional Poster
- Music: Jelly Roll Morton; Luther Henderson
- Lyrics: Susan Birkenhead
- Book: George C. Wolfe
- Basis: The life of Jelly Roll Morton
- Productions: 1991 Los Angeles; 1992 Broadway; 2024 Encores!
- Awards: Drama Desk Award for Outstanding Book of a Musical; Drama Desk Award for Outstanding Lyrics

Jelly's Last Jam is a musical with a book by George C. Wolfe, lyrics by Susan Birkenhead, and music by Jelly Roll Morton and Luther Henderson. Based on the life and career of Ferdinand Joseph LaMothe, known as Jelly Roll Morton and generally regarded as one of the primary driving forces behind the introduction of jazz to the American public in the early 20th century, it also serves as a social commentary on the African-American experience during the era. After a world premiere run in Los Angeles in 1991, Jelly's Last Jam first opened on Broadway in April 1992. It was nominated for 11 Tony Awards and took home three.

== Plot ==
The musical opens with the recently deceased Morton in a state of limbo, looking back on his life. He is reluctantly guided by the mysterious 'Chimney Man,' who forces him to recall the more painful moments of his life when he attempts to ignore or embellish them. Born into an old and wealthy mixed-race Creole family in New Orleans, the young Morton rebels against his upbringing by going into the streets and absorbing the rhythms of the vendors and poor blacks, meeting blues musician Buddy Bolden. When his Creole grandmother discovers his new lifestyle, she disowns him.

Forced to go on the road, Morton becomes a prominent composer and musician, and the self-proclaimed creator of jazz. His sadness over his family's rejection causes him to stress his Creole ancestry and claim that there are 'no black notes in my song.' Eventually his pride and racism cause him to betray his best friend and the woman he loves. In his later years, as the Jazz culture continues to grow, Morton is largely forgotten and reduced to dealing with crooked music publishers and gangsters, eventually dying of a knife wound in the colored wing of a Los Angeles hospital. At the moment of his death, Morton at last admits to his heritage - "Ain't no black notes in my song/I was wrong/ I was wrong." At this moment, the shadows of the people in his life surround him to congratulate him, and Morton takes his place in history among the other Jazz legends.

== Production history ==
=== Los Angeles (1991) ===
Jelly's Last Jam premiered at the Mark Taper Forum, Los Angeles, California, on February 24, 1991, with an official opening night on March 7. It was directed by book-writer George C. Wolfe. Obba Babatunde, best known at the time for earning a Tony nomination in Dreamgirls, played Jelly Roll. Some of the cast included Keith David as Chimney Man, Freda Payne as Gran Mimi, and Ruben Santiago-Hudson as Buddy Bolden. George Tsypin was the set designer, Toni-Leslie James was the costume designer, James F. Ingalls was the lighting designer, and Hope Clarke was the choreographer. Linda Twine was the music director. The production closed on April 21, 1991.

=== Broadway (1992-1993) ===
The Broadway production opened at the Virginia Theatre on April 26, 1992, and closed on September 5, 1993, after 569 performances and 25 previews. The musical was directed by Wolfe, choreographed by Hope Clarke with tap choreography by Gregory Hines and Ted L. Levy, scenic design by Robin Wagner, costume design by Toni-Leslie James, and lighting design by Jules Fisher.

In addition to Gregory Hines and Savion Glover as the older and younger Morton, the cast included Keith David as the Chimney Man, Tonya Pinkins as Anita, Ann Duquesnay as Gran Mimi, Stanley Wayne Mathis as Jack the Bear, Mary Bond Davis as Miss Maime and Ruben Santiago-Hudson as Buddy Bolden. Stephanie Pope, Mamie Duncan-Gibbs and Allison M. Williams appeared as the musical trio the Honies, with Ken Ard, and Brenda Braxton appearing in the show's ensemble. Later in the show's run, Phylicia Rashad, Brian Stokes Mitchell and Ben Vereen joined the cast, replacing Pinkins, Hines and David respectively.

An original cast recording was produced by Thomas Z. Shepard for Mercury Records.

=== New York City Center Revival (2024) ===
The musical was mounted by New York City Center Encores! on February 21, and ran through March 3, 2024. The production was directed by Robert O'Hara with choreography by Edgar Godineaux and tap choreography by Dormeshia. Nicholas Christopher starred as Jelly opposite Billy Porter as the Chimney Man, Joaquina Kalukango as Anita and Leslie Uggams as Gran Mimi. Pope, Duncan-Gibbs and Williams reprised their roles as the Hunnies from the original Broadway production. Okieriete Onaodowan and Alaman Diadhiou also starred as Buddy Bolden and Young Jelly.

== Reception ==
John Lahr wrote the introduction to the printed script of Jelly's Last Jam, and noted that the musical "reclaims the gorgeous power of tap dancing as part of musical storytelling". A documentary about the creation of Jelly's Last Jam was produced by PBS-TV titled Jammin' Jelly Roll Morton on Broadway. It was narrated by Denzel Washington and received generally positive reception.

=== Broadway (1992-1993) ===
The Broadway production was nominated for nine Drama Desk Awards, winning six (Best Book, Best Lyrics, Best Orchestration/Musical Adaptation, Best Lighting, Best Actor in a Musical, Best Featured Actress in a Musical). It was nominated for eleven Tony Awards and won three (Best Performance by a Leading Actor in a Musical, Best Performance by a Featured Actress in a Musical, and Best Lighting Design.

It received generally mixed to positive reviews. The New York Times praised the talent of actor Gregory Hines as Jelly Roll Morton, and wrote that the show "is not merely an impressionistic biography of the man who helped ignite the 20th-century jazz revolution, but it is also a sophisticated attempt to tell the story of the birth of jazz in general and, through that story, the edgy drama of being black in the tumultuous modern America that percolated to jazz's beat." However, some critics faulted the second act, an issue with the book that similarly received criticism in the 2024 revival. Variety described the book as "aimless and repetitive" and claimed that the production collapsed in the second act. Despite this, in the same review it praised the acting and singing talents of the performers, the music, and the "explosive" dance numbers.

=== New York City Center Revival (2024) ===
The New York Times described the 2024 New York City Center Encores production as "sensational" and "jaw-dropping," praising the music, plot, and tap choreography. Vulture praised how well-suited Nicholas Christopher was for the role of Jelly and noted that "it’s just impressive how elaborate a production its creators can pull together during a ten-day rehearsal period." Theater Pizzazz described the production as a "handsomely mounted, gorgeously cast, and incredibly polished revival" and New York Theater magazine described it as a "starry showcase of exquisite blues singing, lively jazz playing and energetic tap dancing."

== Song list ==
All songs are written by Jelly Roll Morton with additional music by Luther Henderson and lyrics by Susan Birkenhead, unless indicated.

Act I

- "Prologue" - The Chimney Man
- "Jelly's Jam" (based on "King Porter Stomp") - The Hunnies, Crowd
- "In My Day" - Jelly, The Hunnies
- "The Creole Way" (Music by Luther Henderson) - Young Jelly, Amede, Viola, Ancestors
- "The Whole World's Waitin' to Sing Your Song" (based on "My Little Dixie Home")- Jelly, Young Jelly, Street Crowd
- "Michigan Water" - Miss Mamie, Buddy
- "The Banishment" (composed of "Get Away Boy" (music by Henderson) and "Lonely Boy Blues" (traditional)) - Gran Mimi, Young Jelly, Jelly
- "Somethin' More" (based on "Pretty Lil") - Jelly, Jack, The Chimney Man, The Hunnies, Dancers
- "That's How You Jazz" (based on "Salty Dog") - Jelly, Jack, Dancers
- "The Chicago Stomp" (based on "Burning the Iceberg") - Jelly, The Chimney Man, The Hunnies, The Red Hot Peppers, Chicago Crowd
- "Play the Music for Me" - Anita
- "Lovin' Is a Lowdown Blues" - The Hunnies
- "Doctor Jazz" (Music by King Oliver and Walter Melrose, additional lyrics by Susan Birkenhead) - Jelly, Crowd

Act II

- "Good Ole New York" - The Chimney Man, The Hunnies, New York Crowd
- "Too Late, Daddy" (music by Henderson - Jelly, Harlem Crowd
- "That's the Way We Do Things in New Yawk" - Jelly, The Melrose Brothers
- "Jelly's Isolation Dance" - Jelly
- "The Last Chance Blues" - Jelly, Anita
- "Creole Boy" - Jelly
- "We Are The Rhythms That Color Your Song" - Company

== Cast and characters ==
| Characters | Los Angeles | Broadway | Encores! |
| Characters | 1991 | 1992 | 2024 |
|---|---|---|---|
| Jelly Roll Morton | Obba Babatunde | Gregory Hines | Nicholas Christopher |
| Chimney Man | Keith David | Keith David | Billy Porter |
| The Hunnies | Phylliss Bailey | Mamie Ducan-Gibbs | Mamie Ducan-Gibbs |
| The Hunnies | Patty Hollie | Stephanie Pope | Stephanie Pope |
| The Hunnies | Regina Le Vert | Allison M. Williams | Allison M. Williams |
| Miss Mamie | Karole Foreman | Mary Bond Davis | Tiffany Mann |
| Gran Mimi | Freda Payne | Ann Duquesnay | Leslie Uggams |
| Anita | Tonya Pinkins | Tonya Pinkins | Joaquina Kalukango |
| Young Jelly | Robert Barry Fleming | Savion Glover | Alaman Diadhiou |
| Buddy Bolden | Ruben Santiago-Hudson | Ruben Santiago-Hudson | Okierete Onaodowan |
| Jack The Bear | Stanley Wayne Mathis | Stanley Wayne Mathis | John Clay III |

=== Notable cast replacements ===
==== Broadway (1992-1993) ====
- Jelly Roll Morton: Brian Stokes Mitchell
- Chimney Man: Ken Ard, Ben Vereen
- Anita: Phylicia Rashad

== Awards and nominations ==
=== Original Broadway production ===
| Year | Award | Category | Nominee | Result |
|---|---|---|---|---|
| 1992 | Tony Award | Best Musical | | Nominated |
| 1992 | Tony Award | Best Book of a Musical | George C. Wolfe | Nominated |
| 1992 | Tony Award | Best Original Score | Jelly Roll Morton, Luther Henderson and Susan Birkenhead | Nominated |
| 1992 | Tony Award | Best Performance by a Leading Actor in a Musical | Gregory Hines | Won |
| 1992 | Tony Award | Best Performance by a Featured Actor in a Musical | Keith David | Nominated |
| 1992 | Tony Award | Best Performance by a Featured Actress in a Musical | Tonya Pinkins | Won |
| 1992 | Tony Award | Best Direction of a Musical | George C. Wolfe | Nominated |
| 1992 | Tony Award | Best Choreography | Hope Clarke, Ted L. Levy and Gregory Hines | Nominated |
| 1992 | Tony Award | Best Scenic Design | Robin Wagner | Nominated |
| 1992 | Tony Award | Best Costume Design | Toni-Leslie James | Nominated |
| 1992 | Tony Award | Best Lighting Design | Jules Fisher | Won |
| 1992 | Drama Desk Award | Outstanding Musical | | Nominated |
| 1992 | Drama Desk Award | Outstanding Book of a Musical | George C. Wolfe | Won |
| 1992 | Drama Desk Award | Outstanding Actor in a Musical | Gregory Hines | Won |
| 1992 | Drama Desk Award | Outstanding Featured Actor in a Musical | Savion Glover | Nominated |
| 1992 | Drama Desk Award | Outstanding Featured Actress in a Musical | Tonya Pinkins | Won |
| 1992 | Drama Desk Award | Outstanding Director of a Musical | George C. Wolfe | Nominated |
| 1992 | Drama Desk Award | Outstanding Choreography | Hope Clarke, Gregory Hines & Ted L. Levy | Nominated |
| 1992 | Drama Desk Award | Outstanding Orchestrations | Luther Henderson | Won |
| 1992 | Drama Desk Award | Outstanding Lyrics | Susan Birkenhead | Won |
| 1992 | Drama Desk Award | Outstanding Costume Design | Toni-Leslie James | Nominated |
| 1992 | Drama Desk Award | Outstanding Lighting Design | Jules Fisher | Won |
| 1993 | Outer Critics Circle Awards | Best Actor – Musical | Gregory Hines | Nominated |
| 1993 | Outer Critics Circle Awards | Best Actress – Musical | Tonya Pinkins | Won |
| 1993 | Outer Critics Circle Awards | Best Broadway Musical | | Won |
| 1993 | Outer Critics Circle Awards | Best Choreography | Hope Clarke, Gregory Hines and Ted Levy | Won |
