= Bring in 'da Noise, Bring in 'da Funk =

1995 musical

- Music: Daryl Waters; Zane Mark; Ann Duquesnay
- Lyrics: Reg E. Gaines; George C. Wolfe; Ann Duquesnay
- Book: Reg E. Gaines
- Productions: 1995 Off Broadway; 1996 Broadway

Bring in 'da Noise, Bring in 'da Funk is a musical that debuted Off-Broadway at the New York Shakespeare Festival/Public Theater in 1995 and moved to Broadway in 1996. The show was conceived and directed by George C. Wolfe, and featured music by Daryl Waters, Zane Mark and Ann Duquesnay; lyrics by Reg E. Gaines, George C. Wolfe and Ann Duquesnay; and a book by Reg E. Gaines. The choreography was by Savion Glover.

== Productions ==
Bring in 'da Noise, Bring in 'da Funk premiered off-Broadway at the Public Theater's Newman Theatre on November 3, 1995, and closed on January 28, 1996, after 85 performances. Directed by George C. Wolfe with costumes by Karen Perry, set design by Ricardo Hernandez, lighting by Jules Fisher and Peggy Eisenhauer, and Production Managed by Bonnie Metzgar. The cast included Savion Glover, Duquesnay, Gaines, and Dulé Hill.

The musical moved to the Ambassador Theatre on Broadway, opening there on April 25, 1996. The show closed after 1135 performances on January 10, 1999. The opening night cast included Jeffrey Wright, Glover, Duquesnay and Hill. Again directed by Wolfe, with sets and lighting by the off-Broadway team, costume design was by Paul Tazewell. Glover left the show but returned for 40 performances from December 8, 1998, through January 10, 1999.

Glover toured with the musical in 2002.

The Original Broadway Cast recording was issued by RCA Victor (09026-68565-2).

== Concept ==
Bring in 'da Noise, Bring in 'da Funk is a musical revue telling the story, through tap, of black history from slavery to the present. The musical numbers are presented along with supertitles, projected images and videotapes and with continuing commentary.

Wolfe took the rap words of Reg E. Gaines and turned them into "tap/rap (tap dancing informed by hip-hop and funk rhythms)."

== Songs ==
Act 1

- Bring in 'da Noise Bring in 'da Funk
- The Door to Isle Goree
- Slave Ships
- Som'thin' From Nuthin'/ The Circle Stomp
- The Pan Handlers
- The Lynching Blues
- Chicago Bound
- Shifting Sounds
- Industrialization
- The Chicago Riot Rag
- I Got the Beat/Dark Tower
- The Whirligig Stomp

Act 2

- Now That's Tap Grin & Flash
- The Uncle Huck-a-Buck Song
- Kid Go!
- The Lost Beat Swing
- Green, Chaney, Buster, Slyde
- 1956, Them Conkheads
- 1967, Hot Fun
- 1977, Blackout
- 1987, Gospel/Hip Hop Rant
- Drummin'
- Taxi
- Conversations
- Hittin'
- Bring in 'da Noise Bring in 'da Funk (Reprise)

== Response ==
In his interview for The New York Times, Ben Brantley wrote: "Mr. Glover has found choreographic equivalents for the black experience in the days of plantations, urban industrialization, the Harlem Renaissance and latter-day race riots...This sense of flaming individuality is finally what the evening is about: not just the collective history of a race but the diverse and specific forms of expression that one tradition embraces."

The review in Entertainment Weekly said that the show is "an explosive and bravely literal-minded chronicle of the genre's history from slavery to the present. The music is beautiful and the dancing exuberant, but Funk is serious business, with vicious, funny send-ups of Uncle Tomism in Hollywood."

Writing for The New York Times, Margo Jefferson stated that: "as dance, as musical, as theater, as art, as history and entertainment, there's nothing Noise/Funk cannot and should not do."

The musical made an "extraordinary political statement ... as well as the equally significant growth in dance this show launched."

== Awards and nominations ==
=== Original Broadway production ===
| Year | Award | Category | Nominee | Result |
|---|---|---|---|---|
| 1996 | Tony Award | Best Musical | | Nominated |
| 1996 | Tony Award | Best Book of a Musical | Reg E. Gaines | Nominated |
| 1996 | Tony Award | Best Original Score | Daryl Waters, Zane Mark, Ann Duquesnay, George C. Wolfe and Reg E. Gaines | Nominated |
| 1996 | Tony Award | Best Performance by a Leading Actor in a Musical | Savion Glover | Nominated |
| 1996 | Tony Award | Best Performance by a Featured Actress in a Musical | Ann Duquesnay | Won |
| 1996 | Tony Award | Best Direction of a Musical | George C. Wolfe | Won |
| 1996 | Tony Award | Best Choreography | Savion Glover | Won |
| 1996 | Tony Award | Best Costume Design | Paul Tazewell | Nominated |
| 1996 | Tony Award | Best Lighting Design | Jules Fisher and Peggy Eisenhauer | Won |
| 1996 | Drama Desk Award | Outstanding Musical | | Nominated |
| 1996 | Drama Desk Award | Outstanding Actor in a Musical | Savion Glover | Nominated |
| 1996 | Drama Desk Award | Outstanding Director of a Musical | George C. Wolfe | Nominated |
| 1996 | Drama Desk Award | Outstanding Choreography | Savion Glover | Won |
| 1996 | Drama Desk Award | Outstanding Lighting Design | Jules Fisher and Peggy Eisenhauer | Won |
