= Oreo (novel) =

Novel by Fran Ross

- Dust-jacket from the first edition
- Author: Fran Ross
- Cover artist: Ann Twombly
- Language: English
- Genre: Novel
- Publisher: Northeastern University Press
- Publication date: 1974
- Publication place: United States
- Media type: Print (Paperback)
- Pages: 212 pp
- ISBN: 1-55553-464-3
- OCLC: 44461973
- Dewey Decimal: 813/.54 21
- LC Class: PS3568.O8433 O74 2000

Oreo is a 1974 satirical novel by American writer Fran Ross, a journalist and, briefly, a comedy writer for Richard Pryor. The novel, addressing issues of a mixed-heritage child, was considered "before its time" and went out of print until Harryette Mullen rediscovered the novel and brought it out of obscurity.

The book has since acquired cult classic status.

== Plot summary ==
Born into a taboo relationship that neither of her grandparents supported, having a Jewish father and black mother who divorce before she is two, Oreo grows up in Philadelphia with her maternal grandparents while her mother tours with a theatrical troupe. Soon after puberty, Oreo heads for New York with a duffel bag to search for her father; but in the big city she discovers that there are dozens of Sam Schwartzes (her father's name) in the phone book, and Oreo's mission turns into a humorous picaresque quest. The ambitious and playful narrative challenges accepted notions of race, ethnicity, culture, and even the novelistic form itself; its quest theme is inspired by that of the Greek tale of Theseus. In the end, Oreo witnesses her own father's death as he falls from a window.

Ross uses the structure of the Theseus myth to both trap Oreo and allow her to reinvent it.

== Genre ==
Oreo is a picaresque novel revolving around its eponymous picaroon. The work, with its witty critiques of social attitudes about race and ethnicity, also can be characterized as Menippean Satire. Oreo's heroine faces various adventures and conflicts during her search for her long-absent father. Some have said the work falls under the category of Post-Soul Aesthetic, modern works that expands upon the possibilities of the Black experience, if not the New Black Aesthetic, works describing the black experience from the perspective of the culturally-hybrid, second-generation middle class. The comedic style of the novel helps to subvert the trope of the "tragic mulatto" and position Oreo as a "thriving hybrid".

== Structure ==
The novel is told from the perspective of an omniscient, third-person. The novel strays from traditional narrative form. The novel exemplifies the essence of postmodernism, fragmentation through its structure.The chapters are broken into subsections. The novel uses diagram, equations, menus, tests, ads, letters, other sources to break and supplement the narrative.

Ross employs different narrative structures throughout the course of the novel. Mainly, the episodic nature of the book is similar to the picaresque story structure. Elements of the bildungsroman are also present.

Oreo parodies the Theseus myth. A quick reading guide at the end of the book summarizes the story's events in terms of the myth. The names of the novel's chapters are also references to the Greek myth.

== Themes ==
=== Identity ===
Identity, and its flexibility, proves to be a strong thematic presence in the novel.

=== Language ===
The novel uses many different languages, including African-American vernacular, Yiddish, superstandard language, louise-ese, math, rhyme, singing.

Language is associated with social standing, intelligence, geographical climates, socioeconomic status, and race.

=== Humor ===
One of the most important aspects of the novel is Ross’ use of humor. As one critic comments, "her throwaway lines have more zing than most comic writers’ studied arias." Her use of language is incredibly playful and acerbic, both prosaic and poetic. In her foreword to the novel, author Danzy Senna calls Ross a comic mulatto, stating that her verbal precocity turns the word on its head.

=== Greek Mythology ===
Like Theseus, Oreo embarks on a journey to search for her missing father with the help of few clues. Ross provides a succinct and satirical commentary in the last chapter to highlight the parallel between the two stories. Traditional aspects of the myth – such as the shoes and sandals Theseus is given before embarking on his quest – are reworked to seem unnecessary and slightly ridiculous.

== Critical response ==
Upon its republication by Northeastern University Press in 2000, the then nearly 30-year-old novel was praised for being ahead of its time. Oreo has been hailed as "one of the masterpieces of 20th century American comic writing." Furthermore, one critic elaborated that Oreo was "a true twenty-first century novel." The novel's "wit is global, hybrid and uproarious ... simultaneously irreverent, appropriative and serious. It is post-everything: post-modern, post-identity politics, post-politically correct." Novelist Paul Beatty also included an excerpt of Oreo in his 2006 anthology of African-American humor Hokum. In June 2007, Cultural critic Jalylah Burrell listed the book on VIBE.com as the number one work in African-American literature that should be adapted into a major motion picture, writing, "Quirky comedy with surrealist elements, i.e., Wes Anderson meets Kaufman/Gondry."

Mat Johnson chose Oreo for his 2011 appearance on the NPR program You Must Read This, describing it as "one of the funniest books I've ever read, but I've never quoted it. To do so, I would have to put quotations before the first page and then again at the last." He too stated that as a "feminist odyssey", published eight years before Alice Walker's The Color Purple, the book had simply been ahead of its time: "A truly original view of our world is what we yearn for in fiction, but sometimes when something is so original, so many years ahead of its time, it takes time for the audience to catch up to it. It's a statement of how far we've come that for this quirky, hilarious, odd, little biracial black book, that time is now."

=== Relationship to Roots ===
Oreo came out around the same time as Alex Haley's seminal novel Roots: The Saga of an American Family. Both boundary-breaking books for their time in terms of shedding light on the contemporary black experience, Roots went on to be wildly successful, occupying the number one spot on the New York Times best-seller list for 22 weeks. It was then adapted into an extremely popular television miniseries, one that defined the cultural iconography of the American black experience for many generations. [1] [2] Oreo, in contrast, fell into obscurity soon after publication. It fell out of print for years, until 2000, when the efforts of black poets and writers, in particular Harryette Mullen and Danzy Senna, brought it back into publication and to a certain cult-status. There are many reasons for Oreo's initial obscurity. Perhaps the most notable is that Haley's work presented a more unified picture of the black experience, one that was easier for viewers to latch onto during the tumultuous years of the Civil Rights era. Oreo, a story about a biracial black girl, is a far more complicated look at racial identity than Haley's exploration of heritage. Published eight years before Alice Walker's The Color Purple, Oreo was also ahead of its time in the way it addressed feminist themes and the intersection between black and Jewish identity. One critic pointed out that being published in 1974, "during the height of the Black Power movement with its focus on African-based identity and black male power" Oreo almost had no chance at success because the public audience was not ready to take in such a complicated work.

== Film adaptation ==
The novel was adapted by Adam Davenport into a screenplay intended as a starring vehicle for Keke Palmer. The project is yet to be produced.
