= Caucasia (novel) =

1998 novel by Danzy Senna

- Author: Danzy Senna
- Language: English
- Genre: Bildungsroman
- Publisher: Riverhead
- Publication date: February 1, 1998
- Publication place: United States
- Media type: Print (hardback and paperback)
- Pages: 413

Caucasia (1998) is the first novel written by American author Danzy Senna. It is the coming-of-age story of two multiracial girls, Birdie Lee and her sister Cole, who have a Caucasian mother and an African-American father. The novel is set in Boston, Massachusetts, during the turbulent mid-1970s.

Much of the novel centers on the theme of racial passing. Senna upends the traditional "tragic mulatto" story line by exploring Birdie's desire to be accepted as African-American, although she appears to be Caucasian. Growing up on the run, and fearful her true identity could endanger her mother's life, Birdie seeks to understand who she is and how she fits into the world. She longs for her sister Cole and their father, ultimately running away from home to find them.

== Background and historical context ==
Caucasia is set in 1975 Boston, Massachusetts. Violent protests disrupted the city as forced desegregation was implemented in public schools beginning in the 1974 school year. Boston busing desegregation flamed racial tensions, resulting in riots, beatings and violence which persisted for many years.

Birdie's parents met in January 1963 during the Kennedy administration. They marry and have their first daughter, Colette/Cole in 1964; Birdie is born in 1967. At that time, there were anti-miscegenation laws in many US states. These were not overturned until the 1967 Supreme Court ruling Loving v. Virginia. Within the context of the novel, Birdie's inclination to try to make herself invisible due to the racial tension she felt in her home positioned her as a "neutered mutation" within Trey Ellis' concept of the "cultural mulatto".

During this period the strategy for social change through peaceful protests that are associated with the Civil Rights Movement were being challenged by new African-American leaders. Malcolm X urged a demand for human rights 'by any means necessary. Stokely Carmichael is credited with the first popular use of term "Black Power" in 1963 at a Civil Rights rally. Following the assassination of Malcolm X in 1965, the Black Panther Party for Self-Defense was created by Bobby Seale and Huey Newton.

Violence was used as a form of protest by groups such as Weather Underground, notorious for mail bombs and bank robberies, and the Symbionese Liberation Army (SLA), the organization that kidnapped heiress Patty Hearst in 1974.

== Plot summary ==
The novel's narrator is Birdie Lee, a multiracial child who has a white mother and a black father. She and her sister Cole are very close yet differ in appearance. Her sister is described as "cinnamon-skinned, curly-haired", traits associated with African Americans of mixed race. Birdie describes herself as a brown haired, light-skinned girl and her interactions with others indicate she is lighter-skinned than her sister and can pass as white. "... [T]he woman behind the desk took one look at Cole and me and assigned us to different districts. I would be bused to the predominantly African-American school in Dorchester; Cole to South Boston, the Irish section, 'in the interest of dahversetty,' the woman explained ..."

The book is written in three parts: Part 1 takes place in 1975 Boston and Roxbury, Massachusetts, when Birdie is eight years old; Part 2 takes place in a small town in New Hampshire six years later when Birdie is 14 years old; Part 3 takes place when Birdie is 14 ½ years old and runs away from her mother to try to find her father and sister.

Part 1: "Negritude for beginners"

It is 1975 and eight-year-old Birdie Lee lives with her family in Roxbury, Massachusetts. She and her older sister, Cole, converse in their room using their made-up language, Elemeno. The pair can hear their Caucasian mother, Sandy and African-American father Deck, arguing downstairs. The confrontation results in Deck moving out for good.

Sandy tells the girls that they will attend a public school, instead of Nkrumah, the private Black Power School in Boston. They are assigned to two different school districts, "'in the interest of dahversetty'". Birdie is sent to a predominantly black school in Dorchester, while Cole is sent to a south Boston Irish school. Sandy dismisses this decision, and the receptionist buses them both to a school in South Boston. An assault on an African-American man by Irish men in the South school district makes the news and the first day of classes are cancelled. The girls are sent to the African-American power school, after all.

At Nkrumah, Birdie is questioned by the other students wanting to know what race she is; they ask if she's Puerto Rican and demand: "What you doin' in this school? You white?" With Cole's sisterly protection, in addition to changing her hair, dress and speech patterns to fit in with the other African-American students, Birdie successfully passes as an African American. Birdie begins to find kinship with her peers. She meets Maria, a schoolgirl who invites her to go steady with a certain boy; she agrees. Through this connection, Birdie becomes close friends with a group of girls who call themselves the Brown Sugars, and her popularity flourishes.

Near the end of the school year, Birdie's parents finally divorce and Deck announces that he is moving to Brazil with his new girlfriend, Carmen, and taking Cole with him. A traumatized Birdie is left with her grieving mother. Sandy fears she is wanted by the Federal Bureau of Investigation (FBI) (COINTELPRO) for terrorist activities and the two take off. Birdie becomes Jesse Goldman, a girl with Jewish ancestry. Her mother becomes Sheila Goldman.

Part 2: "From Caucasia with love"

Sandy and Birdie are on the run for four years, in the land of "Caucasia". With fake identities, they become the widow Sheila Goldman and Jewish, white daughter Jesse Goldman. Sheila/Sandy is able to find jobs wherever she and Jesse/Birdie go because she plays up her whiteness and well-educated demeanor. Sandy/Sheila finally decides to settle down in a small town in New Hampshire, where she and Birdie/Jesse rent out a small cottage maintained by Walter and Libby Marsh. Birdie/Jesse meets the Marsh's son, fifteen-year-old Nicholas Marsh, who is home for the summer before heading back to Exeter for school. He makes some romantic advances towards Birdie.

Sandy meets a Jim Campbell at the bar and a relationship begins to form, much to Birdie's displeasure. Birdie begins to realize she wants to be identified as African-American when Nicholas calls her "Poca" — a reference to her skin tone in the light. When summer ends, Nicholas heads back to Exeter and Birdie attends the local public school with the other "townies". Birdie ends up befriending a clique of white girls by imitating their appearances and interests. In this school, Birdie notices Samantha Taper, who is also biracial but, unlike Birdie, does not "pass" as Caucasian and is bullied for it.

Birdie finds a postcard from Dot in Sandy's room and realizes she has been in contact with the family after all. By Christmas, Sandy has told Jim the truth about their true identities, including Birdie's parentage. Birdie feels betrayed and begins to question if the FBI was ever after her mother. By the end of this section, she decides to run away from home to Boston and look for her Aunt Dot, and hopefully find her father and her sister.

Part 3: "Compared to what"

In Boston, Birdie uses the address on the postcard to find Aunt Dot, who now has a daughter, Taj. Aunt Dot notifies Sandy that Birdie has run away to Boston, but when Sandy and Jim come to pick her up, she refuses to leave with them. Birdie reconnects with her first boyfriend from Nkrumah, Ali Parkman, whose father Ronnie was Deck's best friend. She learns from Ronnie that her own father returned from Brazil and settled in California years earlier. Ronnie provides her with Deck's most recent phone number and address. While distraught that Deck has not tried to find her, she commits to going to San Francisco to find Deck and Cole. With financial help from her white, waspish grandmother, Penelope Lodge, Birdie flies to San Francisco.

In San Francisco, she breaks into Deck's home before he arrives. Upon their reunion, Birdie finds out he lives alone and although he professes to be glad to see Birdie again, he is emotionally distant. When the topic of Sandy is broached, he alludes to her flight from the FBI, confirming Birdie's suspicions that Sandy was in little, if any, danger of being pursued by COINTELPRO. He eagerly shares his philosophy about race, a project he had been working on since the Roxbury years, that "... mulattos had historically been the gauge of how poisonous American race relations were," as part of his "Canaries in the Coal Mine" theory. His preoccupation with his theories on race over his concern for her through all the years he was absent from her life causes Birdie to express her anger towards him.

Eventually, Birdie's father takes her to Cole and the sisters reunite after seven years apart. Birdie gives Cole Sandy's number and the three of them decide they will meet during the summer. Birdie decides she will remain in San Francisco with Cole and go to school there. The story ends with Birdie seeing a mixed, African American in a school bus as it drives away from her.

== Characters ==
- Birdie Lee: The narrator of the novel. Her birth certificate states her name as Baby Lee. Birdie is also called Le Chic by the Nkrumah Brown Sugar clique, and Pocahontas or Poca by Nicholas Marsh.
- Jesse (Jess) Goldman: The fake Jewish identity Birdie's mother gives her so they can settle in New Hampshire when she is 12 years old.
- Colette (Cole) Lee: Birdie's older sister. She is named after her mother's favorite author, Colette. For Birdie, Cole is the mirror in which she can see her blackness.
- Sandy Lodge Lee: Birdie and Cole's mother. She is white, and from an upper crust Boston family whose lineage traces back to Cotton Mather.
- Sheila Goldman: The fake identity Sandy uses when she and Birdie settle in New Hampshire.
- Deck Lee: Birdie and Cole's father. Deck is a black intellectual who teaches and writes on race theory.
- Dot Lee: Deck's younger sister and Birdie's "favorite adult."
- Carmen: A girlfriend of Deck's after he divorces Sandy.
- Penelope Lodge: Birdie's white grandmother; Sandy's mother.
- Walter and Libby Marsh: Couple that rents the cottage to Sandy/Sheila in New Hampshire.
- Nicholas Marsh: Walter and Libby's son who goes to boarding school, who is a few years older than Birdie/Jesse.
- Jim: A man Sandy/Sheila meets in New Hampshire and forms a relationship with.
- Samantha Taper: An adopted mixed-race child with white parent at the New Hampshire school Birdie/Jesse attends

== Themes ==
=== Identity ===
Birdie's struggle with identity is central throughout the novel. Many people in her life try to assign her an identity based on her appearance. Carmen, Penelope, her classmates, and even her own mother, Sandy deny Birdie's blackness and expect her to behave as if she is white. When Birdie and Sandy go undercover, Birdie is forced to deny her blackness in public. Living in a white New Hampshire town, Birdie's primary connection to her blackness and her past is the box of Negrobilia gifted to her by Deck before he and Cole left for Brazil. Even Deck, a man who once claimed that no child of his could pass as white, dismisses Birdie's struggle for identity by saying that race does not exist.

In attempting to find her identity, Birdie identifies with the objects and people she sees around her, most notably her sister Cole. When Birdie makes a trip to New York City and sees young black people dancing to hip-hop, it seems to motivate her to reconnect with her blackness. Similarly, after an encounter with Samantha, she decides to return to Boston to find Cole. When Birdie and Cole are separated, Birdie turns her focus towards the Negrobilia box to help her become one with her African-American heritage. As she continues with her life, she begins to add things to the box to continue to feel connected to her black heritage now that her family is gone. This includes a strand of hair that she takes from Samantha, another multiracial girl she meets.

=== Invisibility and disappearing ===
There are several instances of Birdie confronting her invisibility and disappearance in various social spheres: with Carmen, the students at Nkrumah, Nicholas, students at the local public school in New Hampshire, and most approximately, with her own mother and father. The first line of the novel, "A long time ago I disappeared ..." foreshadows this element. Usually, this disappearing is accompanied by some kind of contrasting reappearance, as is the case when Birdie and her mother disappear from their home in Boston after Sandy speculates they are being pursued by the FBI, and reappear in New Hampshire as the Jewish mother-daughter duo, Jesse (Jess) Goldman and Sheila Goldman, respectively. Other characters also experience this phenomenon. For instance, when free-spirited Aunt Dot disappears to India and reappears some years later slightly changed, and the mother of a four-year girl named Taj. Or when Birdie's father and sister disappear to Brazil and reappear in San Francisco.

Birdie also faces instances of invisibility—particularly in her relationship with her father who seems to prefer her older and darker sister, Cole. Deck's girlfriend, Carmen, also demonstrates this preference upon meeting Birdie for the first time at dinner.

=== Beauty ===
Cole and Birdie encounter societal expectations of beauty throughout their youth. At Nkrumah, Cole is made fun of for her dry knees in gym class, appearing "ashy" to the other African-American students. Sandy attempts to take care of Cole's hair by braiding it herself, ultimately failing. Eventually, Deck pays for Cole to go to a black hair salon, making her "splendid, ladylike, [and] suddenly in a whole new league." When Birdie is in New Hampshire, she has to learn how to dress and put on make up like the other white girls in her school.

Beauty in Caucasia is closely connected to the identities of the characters and their culture. When Birdie and Cole learn about lotion, Birdie claims that she feels as if she is a part of a secret club, meaning black culture. Cole's nappy hair is looked down upon by her peers, because Cole neglects the beauty expectations of those in the black community. When Birdie starts to dress and mimic the white girls in her New Hampshire class she does so to be accepted and a part of the white community.

Senna also uses varying interpretations of beauty to show how black female bodies are sexualized and criticized. Senna's description of Samantha Taper in Birdie's (now Jesse Goldman) perspective versus that of Birdie's peers exemplifies the hyper-sexualization of black girl bodies. While Birdie describes Samantha as having "deep-set eyes, caramel complexion..." and "full lips", Birdie's classmates mock her by calling her "Wilona", "disgusting", and "Brown Cow" because she has developed breasts. Even after Samantha begins to over-sexualize herself at the beginning of high school, she is criticized for seeking attention and looking like a hooker.

=== Passing ===
The concept of passing has evolved since the 1960s. Before the civil rights movement and up until the 1970s, literature reflected on the desire to pass as analogous to the desire to bypass legal discrimination. However, literature on passing has been "born again" during post-soul, as a concept used to challenge the institutionalized perceptions of race. In Caucasia, the concept of passing is treated as something less than desirable. The main protagonist, Birdie, does not want to pass, but rather be seen as black. The novel deals with the complex relationship that racial identity has with the self and the external environment. In the novel, Deck raises the argument that "...there is no such thing as passing. We're all just pretending. Race is a complete illusion, make-believe." This dichotomy between the idea that race is fictional, yet manifested in reality is something that is analyzed in several instances throughout the novel. Senna notes how passing can be a disorienting experience for one's identity, and in an interview she said,

When you go into passing, you assume that you'll always be clear on the original real self; that the performance will be just the performance. But for Birdie I think that when you do it long enough, you know, that becomes really blurry and dangerous. Your sense of identity becomes really, um, kind of precarious, and nebulous, and so, it became that, for her.

For example, Deck takes Cole off to Brazil with him. Sandy takes Birdie because Birdie is able to pass as white, allowing her and her mother to travel more discretely. Passing as a white, Jewish girl in New Hampshire is what makes Birdie run away in the name of "rebellion and renewal". to confront the "nostalgia for a lost blackness she never really owned."

=== Language ===
Throughout the novel, many of the characters engage in code-switching as a means to cultural acceptance. Birdie in particular masters changing her speech patterns as her situation and identity change. When she and Cole begin attending Nkrumah, they learn African-American Vernacular English from Ebony magazine to appease their predominantly black classmates. And when Birdie begins school in New Hampshire, she learns to become comfortable with the use of racial slurs in conversation with her peers. She also acquires some Jewish phrases to appear more Jewish while in public.

Other characters also use code-switching. For instance, when Birdie's father, Deck, is talking to his friend Ronnie Parkman he speaks in African-American Vernacular English. Likewise, Birdie recounts Redbone as speaking in a "strained dialect", recognizing his failed attempt at black slang during Aunt Dot's going-away party.

== Critical reception ==
In general, for her debut novel, Caucasia, Danzy Senna received positive reviews that praised her writing, themes and innovation. Critics noted the Bildungsroman, Post-soul angle Senna takes to reinvent the tragic mulatto genre, in which instead of a "doomed interracial love affair at its center ... here the lovers are sisters." The New York Times Book Review applauded how "Senna gives new meaning to the twin universal desires for a lost childhood and a new adult self," in an environment in which she passes as white and can "look and act like anyone". The New York Times also commended Senna's execution in joining themes of pubescence with ethnicity, saying: "What Ms. Senna gets so painfully well is how the standard-issue cruelties of adolescence (like being the new kid trying to win acceptance) are revitalized when they encounter race."

Reviews attribute Senna's ability to write this coming-of-age novel about a mixed-race girl so well because she herself lived a life that parallels that of the protagonist's, Birdie. Kirkus Review noted Senna is a "young Boston-raised writer ... herself the product of a mixed marriage, which gives her first fiction an authenticity..." Lori Tharps muses, "The voice of Birdie Lee is so real and compelling, you can't help but wonder if the story is semi-autobiographical..." Claudia Arias goes on to say that Birdie's life is not just a reflection of Senna's life, but a "testimony of the lived experiences of being multiracial and a critique of the rigidity of racial categories in the United States," as a whole.

The subtle, "complex and humane" style of narration with which she discusses hefty topics, such as "the racial divide in America" is highly acclaimed. The Women's Review of Books wrote that Senna "has perfect pitch for all sorts of dialogue, the technical sleight of hand to place the reader deftly in the landscapes and mindscapes of her characters, laugh-out-loud wit and a radical political consciousness so integral to her storytelling that it is never didactic." The Australian remarked on her "fine insights, humor and control", and The Guardian mentioned the breadth of her novel, which discusses on top of racial identity, "liminal states" of "womanhood...sexuality and class".

On the other hand, some critics found Senna's style of writing less favorable. A 2001 review in The Observer noted: "Senna is not above bullying this sort of metaphor into work for her, and too often hangs bells and lights on anything resonant." Sian Preece deemed "Senna's writing has a grace and gravity to it, but lacks lightness". Kathryn Heyman criticized Senna's writing as lacking "emotional depth", and that it "remains vague and disconcertingly clichéd". The Observer in 2000 found Birdie's perspective inadequate as the narrator, and declared her parents more "interesting", because Birdie seems more to be reporting on a "sociological documentary about race", and does not allow "the full force of what had been lost contrast with scenes of the young girl's life of pretense."

Reviews applauded the impressive craftsmanship of Caucasia, seeing this "ambitious debut novel" as a sign of many successes to come. Marilyn Richardson said that "the standard of achievement has just been ratcheted up a couple of notches." Daniel Grassian declared that Danzy Senna was an author to watch, and "will become a major force in twenty-first century American literature".

== Awards and recognition ==
- 1998 Stephen Crane Award for Best New Fiction of the Year
- 1999 American Library Association's Alex Award
- Selected as one of School Library Journal's 23 Best Adult Books for the Young Adult
- Selected as one of the Best Books of the Year by the Los Angeles Times 1998
- Selected as one of Glamour magazine's three Best Novels of the Year by a New Writer 1998
- Whiting Writers Award 2002

== Sources ==
- Senna, Danzy. Caucasia (1998). Riverhead Books. ISBN 978-1-57322-716-2
