= Cheryl Wall =

American literary critic (1948–2020)

Cheryl A. Wall
- Born: Cheryl Ann Wall; October 29, 1948; Manhattan, New York, US
- Died: April 4, 2020 (aged 71); Highland Park, New Jersey
- Education: Howard University (B.A.); Harvard University Ph.D.
- Occupation(s): Literary critic, academic

Cheryl A. Wall (October 29, 1948 – April 4, 2020) was a literary critic and professor of English at Rutgers University. One of the first black women to head an English department at a major research university, she worked for diversity in the literary canon as well as in the classroom. She specialized in black women's writing, particularly the Harlem Renaissance and Zora Neale Hurston. She edited several volumes of Hurston's writings for the Library of America. She was also a section editor for The Norton Anthology of African American Literature and was on the editorial boards of American Literature, African American Review and Signs. An award-winning researcher and teacher, she was named the Board of Governors Zora Neale Hurston Professor in 2007.

Wall had a lifelong commitment to African-American arts and culture and was the founding board chair of the Crossroads Theater Company, the first Black Theater in New Jersey, founded by two Rutgers graduates, Ricardo Khan and Lee Richardson in 1978.

== Biography ==
Cheryl Ann Wall was born in Manhattan, New York, and was raised in Jamaica, Queens. Her father, Rev. Monroe Wall, was a pastor of Mount Calvary Baptist Church in Harlem, and her mother, Rennie Ray (née Strayhorn) Wall, was an English teacher in New York City public schools. Wall attended Rhodes Preparatory School in Manhattan, and studied piano under Margaret Bonds. She went on to earn a B.A. degree in English from Howard University and her Ph.D. from Harvard University on a Ford Foundation scholarship. Upon graduating from Harvard, Wall cited a feeling of alienation due to being one of the few Black women in her graduate program. In 1972, Wall started as a professor at Rutgers University, reflecting that: "When I arrived, I found that there were conversations that I could see myself in, which was very different from my experience in graduate school."

At Rutgers, Wall founded the Rutgers English Diversity Institute, a program to encourage greater diversity among graduate students, as a result of which all English majors were required to complete a course in African-American literature.

Wall died of complications from an asthma attack, at her home in Highland Park, New Jersey, on April 4, 2020, aged 71.

Wall is survived by her daughter, Camara Epps.

== Awards and honors ==
- Policy Makers Award, Executive Women of New Jersey, 2008
- Human Dignity Award, Committee to Advance Our Common Purposes, Rutgers University, 2007
- The Board of Trustees Award for Excellence in Research, Rutgers University, 2006

== Selected publications ==
- Changing Our Own Words: Criticism, Theory and Writing by Black Women (ed., 1989)
- Women of the Harlem Renaissance (1995)
- "Sweat": Texts and Contexts (ed., 1997)
- Their Eyes Were Watching God: A Casebook (ed., 2000)
- Worrying the Line: Black Women Writers, Lineage and Literary Tradition (2005)
- On Freedom and the Will to Adorn: The Art of the African American Essay (2019)
