= Don Evans =

American dramatist (1938–2003)

- Born: Donald Thomas Evans; April 27, 1938; Merchantville, New Jersey, United States
- Died: October 16, 2003 (aged 65); Merchantville, New Jersey, United States
- Spouse: Frances Gooding Chapman (div.)

Donald Thomas Evans (April 27, 1938 – October 16, 2003) was an American playwright, theater director, actor and educator.

== Early life and education ==
Evans was born April 27, 1938, in Philadelphia, Pennsylvania, the son of Mary Evans. After serving in the United States Marine Corps, he graduated from Cheyney State College in 1962 and went on to Temple University, earning a master's degree in 1968 and a Master of Fine Arts in 1972.

== Educational career ==
In 1972, Evans became an associate professor at Trenton State College (later named The College of New Jersey), where he chaired the Afro-American Studies Department. He also was an adjunct professor at Princeton University and a visiting professor of theater arts at Rutgers University. During this time, Evans wrote essays and articles for Black World, Essence, Players, and Pride.

He worked from 1978 to 1998 with his friend and fellow playwright August Wilson in forming a National Black Theatre Summit at Dartmouth College, from which was formed the African Grove Institute for the Arts.

== Theatre ==
Evans studied acting, directing, and playwriting at the Hagen-Berghof Studios in New York City from 1969 to 1970, during which time he also taught English and Drama at Princeton High School in Princeton, New Jersey. Part of the Black Arts Movement of the 1970s, Evans had his first plays, the one-acts Orrin and Sugarmouth Sam Don’t Dance No More performed in 1972 at the Crossroads Theatre, a professional playhouse in New Brunswick, New Jersey. The following year, this became his Manhattan debut production, at the Theater de Lys.

In 1976, Evans wrote It’s Showdown Time, a raucous adaptation of William Shakespeare's The Taming of the Shrew. In 1978, Evans wrote Mahalia, his first musical, a portrait of gospel vocalist Mahalia Jackson. Louis, Evans' musical portrayal of jazz legend Louis Armstrong, was written in 1981. Other works include Blues for a Gospel Queen, The Trials and Tribulations of Staggerlee Booker T. Brown. One Monkey Don't Stop No Show a tragi-comic look at a middle-class black family, and A Lovesong for Miss Lydia, described by The New York Times as a "Pinteresque variation on the Big Bad Wolf story." Evans wrote his final play, When Miss Mollie Hit the Triple Bars, in 1999. It was based on the life of his mother, Mary.

Over the course of his career, Evans received playwriting fellowships from the National Endowment for the Arts, the New Jersey Council of the Arts, and the New Jersey Historical Society. Eighteen of his plays have been produced, both in the US and in countries including Germany, England and Hong Kong. He also served, from 1983 to 1988, as artistic director for the Karamu House in Cleveland, Ohio.

Don Evans was named an AMPARTS Fellow for the United States Information Agency to India in 1984.

== Personal life ==
Evans was divorced from Frances Gooding Chapman. He had by two sons, Todd and Orrin, and a daughter, Rachel Marianno. He died at the age of 65 of a heart attack on October 16, 2003, at his home in Merchantville, New Jersey.

== List of plays ==
Published

- Sugarmouth Sam Don't Dance No More (Dramatists Play Service, NY)
- The Trials and Tribulations of Staggerlee Booker T. Brown (Dramatists Play Service)
- The Prodigals (Dramatists Play Service)
- One Monkey Don't Stop No Show (Dramatists Play Service)

Produced

- Orrin
- Blues For A Gospel Queen
- Sugarmouth Sam Don't Dance No More
- Matters of Choice
- It's Showdown Time
- A Lovesong for Miss Lydia
- Louis (musical based on the life of Louis Armstrong)
- Mahalia (musical biography of Mahalia Jackson)
- One Monkey Don't Stop No Show

Unpublished

- What Harriet Did
- Honky Tonk
- When Miss Mollie Hit the Triple Bars
