= One Monkey Don't Stop No Show (play) =

1982 play by Don Evans

One Monkey Don't Stop No Show is a play by the American playwright Don Evans. Set in 1970s Philadelphia, the play deals with the clash of values between middle-class and working-class African Americans.

One Monkey premiered in the USA in 1982 at the Crossroads Theatre Company, directed by L. Kenneth Richardson and produced by Ricardo Khan. It was revived in 2013 at the Tricycle Theatre in London. It received strong reviews, with Michael Billington stating that "A long-neglected play has been revived with verve and spirit" and Charles Spencer praising "its sharp wit matched with a genuine generosity of spirit".
