= Fly (play) =

2009 drama about the Tuskegee Airmen

- Theatrical poster from Ford's Theater 2009 production
- Original language: English
- Written by: Trey Ellis and Ricardo Khan
- Subject: The Tuskegee Airmen
- Setting: January 20, 2009 (Inauguration Day); Summer of 1943, Tuskegee, Alabama; and in the air over Germany during World War II

Premiere
- Place: Crossroads Theater, New Brunswick, NJ

Fly is a 2009 play written by Trey Ellis and Ricardo Khan about the Tuskegee Airmen, the first black fliers in the U.S. military during World War II.

== Background ==
Khan, one of the play's co-writers and director of the Washington, D.C. production, said that the idea to write the play came from a photo he saw of the Tuskegee Airmen. He said he was "stunned" to see "men of color, dressed in their pilot’s uniforms." Khan said he was so fascinated by the photo that he "wanted to know who these men were," and when he learned more, he knew he wanted to write about them, to "tell their story."

The initial 60-minute version of the play was commissioned in 2005 by Lincoln Center Education, known at that time as Lincoln Center Institute, where Khan was serving as an artist-in-residence. This version of the play was produced by Lincoln Center Education in 2007 and 2008 for young audiences.

A longer version of the play, also commissioned by Lincoln Center Education, was staged in June 2009 at the Vineyard Theater in Massachusetts before the final version had its world premiere in New Brunswick, New Jersey, at Crossroads Theater in October 2009. Khan is co-founder and former artistic director of Crossroads Theater Company, known as "one of the nation's foremost African-American theater companies." One of the main advisors for the Crossroads production was Dr. Roscoe Brown, one of the original Tuskegee Airmen. According to Khan, Brown was the one who first suggested using World War II film clips in the production.

Both writers had dealt with the subject of the Tuskegee Airmen in other works: Khan, in the play "Black Eagles," written by Leslie Lee (playwright), which had been produced at Ford's Theater in 1989; and Ellis in the 1995 HBO film "The Tuskegee Airmen."

== Synopsis ==
Fly tells the story of the first black pilots in the United States military, who would be part of the 332nd Fighter Group of the United States Army Air Forces, but be more well known as the "Tuskegee Airmen," a name taken from Tuskegee, Alabama, the location of the training school where they earned their wings. The group was also called the "Red Tail Black Eagles."

The play uses four characters—Chet, from Harlem; W.W., from Chicago; Oscar, from Iowa; and J. Allen, originally from the West Indies—who represent the varied backgrounds of the men who went through Tuskegee's training, not all graduating and not all surviving the war. Other actors portray white men—instructors and pilots—who questioned the idea that black men could fly in America's military.

The story begins with Chet as an older man, in Washington, D.C., telling the story through flashbacks of his training and service as one of the Tuskegee Airmen, on the day of the inauguration of Barack Obama as the first black President of the United States. The play recalls the fact that the surviving members of the Tuskegee Airmen were invited to participate in that inauguration.

Facing racism at home while they prepared to fight for their country in the air, the Tuskegee airmen were men who (in the words of the Tuskegee Airmen website) "fought two wars—one against a military force overseas and the other against racism at home and abroad."

However, while the fight against racism is central to the play's story, Khan notes that a larger issue central to the play is the pursuit of any dream: "The play is about lifting yourself off the ground, lifting yourself from what holds you down, reaching for your dream and elevating yourself to that place in the mind and the heart that’s the sky."

== Production ==
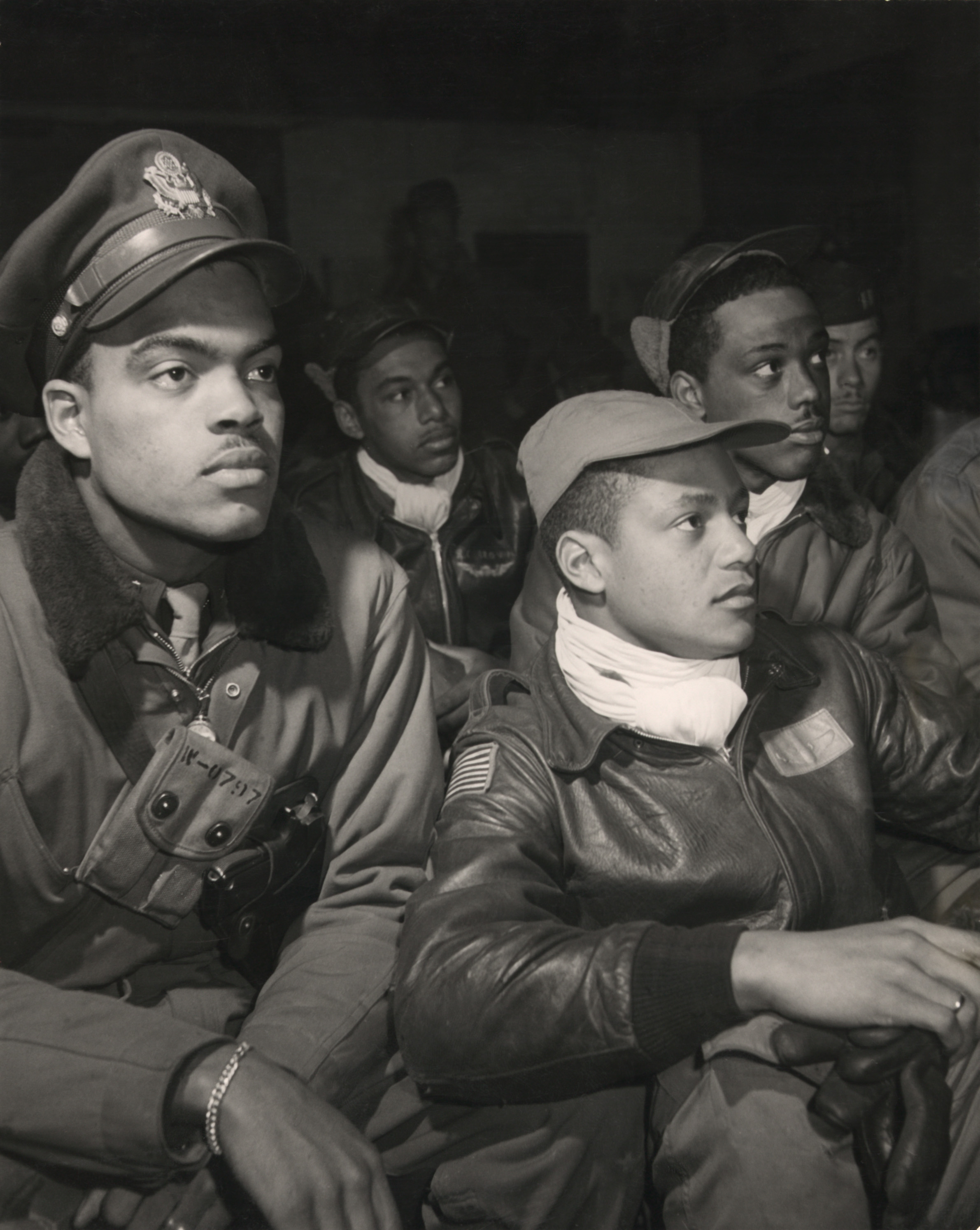
A group of actual Tuskegee Airmen attend a World War II briefing in 1945 – an image similar to scenes depicted in the play.

The play is written to include a cast of eight men, including "Tap Griot," a dancer who uses tap dance steps to set a mood that is "part sublimated anger, part empowerment." This character appears numerous times throughout the play, "commenting choreographically on events and emotions."

As one review notes, "Griot" is defined as "a member of a caste of professional oral historians in the Mali Empire." Keepers of history, if you will, who continue their oral traditions in Western Africa to this day."

Khan, one of the co-writers, notes that the Tap Griot is especially important as a backdrop for the character of Chet, who functions as a narrator for the story: "When Chet’s feeling anger or rage, the tap-dancer uses hard heels to stomp the ground. However, when he feels a moment of beauty or excitement, the tap dancer can express that, too, in a much different way."

Ellis, the other co-writer, adds that another reason the Tap Griot was important is that the characters represented men who had to "restrict their behavior" and hide their emotions during their military service, and so this character was able to "express their feelings in a way that permits their anger to go into the ground and their elation into a jump for joy." This character "tells the part of the story that is about rage when they’re not allowed to, or fear when they’re not allowed to, or mourning when they’re not allowed to," according to Khan.

Large video screens are used in a number of ways during the performance, from opening images of black history in the United States; to scenes of the ground from the cockpit windows of a plane, to give the impression of flight; to final scenes of the actual Tuskegee Airmen. Khan relates that he and Ellis did not simply want to tell a story or show a piece of history, but instead wanted to create a real piece of theater. In some ways, their vision was to expose the audience to a "video game onstage," where their senses would be constantly "stimulated by the resources of the theater." As one review noted, the production is "an exciting war story; it is not a history lecture...and yet that [history] message is there."

When President Obama invited the surviving Tuskegee Airmen to his inauguration, Khan decided to "weave that moment" into the play. The Tuskegee Airmen returned to a nation that was still segregated, but ultimately, their service helped pave the way for changes that would one day come.

The play is written to be performed in 90 minutes, with no intermission.

== Performances ==
After the world premiere at the Crossroads Theater in New Brunswick, the play was performed at the historic Ford's Theater in Washington, D.C., in September 2012, as the second production in a special multi-year "Lincoln Legacy Project," "an effort to create dialogue around the issues of tolerance, equality, and acceptance." A number of Tuskegee Airmen (World War II veterans) attended the opening night performance. There have been a number of productions and co-productions in theaters nationwide, including Florida Studio Theatre, New Victory Theater, a revival at Crossroads Theatre Company, and Cincinnati Playhouse. In 2016, the Pasadena Playhouse production received eight NAACP Theatre Award nominations, winning for Best Lighting, Best Choreography, and Best Production. The Alabama Shakespeare Festival presented the play in 2018. In February 2021, Jefferson Parish Performing Arts Society presented the play, choreographed by Donald Jones, Jr., at Jefferson Performing Arts Center near New Orleans, LA.

== See also ==
- List of African American Medal of Honor recipients
- Military history of African Americans
- Tuskegee Army Airfield
