= Fran Ross =

American novelist

- Born: June 25, 1935; Philadelphia, Pennsylvania, U.S.
- Died: September 17, 1985 (aged 50); New York City, U.S.
- Education: Temple University
- Occupations: Novelist; comedy writer; journalist
- Writing career
- Genres: African-American literature, satire
- Notable work: Oreo

Fran Ross (June 25, 1935 – September 17, 1985) was an American writer best known for her 1974 novel Oreo. She briefly wrote comedy for Richard Pryor.

== Early childhood ==
Born on June 25, 1935, in Philadelphia, she was the eldest daughter of Gerald Ross, a welder, and Bernetta Bass Ross, a store clerk. Recognized for her scholastic, artistic and athletic talents, she earned a scholarship to Temple University after graduating from Overbrook High School at the age of 15.

== Career ==
Ross graduated from Temple University in 1956 with a B. S. degree in Communications, Journalism and Theatre. She worked for a short time at the Saturday Evening Post. Ross moved to New York in 1960, where she applied to work for McGraw-Hill and later Simon & Schuster as a proofreader, working on Ed Koch's first book, among others.

Ross began her novel Oreo hoping for a career in writing, and it was published in 1974 at the height of the Black Power movement of the 1960s and 1970s. Ross's title comes from a white and black cookie, used as an ethnic slur in slang, mastery of whose American varieties is a feature of the novel, and employs the myth of Theseus to narrate the story of a black-Jewish girl searching for, and eventually exacting vengeance on, her father.

Ross also wrote articles for magazines such as Essence, Titters and Playboy, and then got work on The Richard Pryor Show. She was unable to complete a second novel, due to difficulties supporting herself on this work. She worked in media and publishing until she died of cancer on September 17, 1985, in New York City.

Oreo was rediscovered and republished in 2000 by Northeastern University Press, with a new introduction by Harryette Mullen. Mat Johnson has hailed Ross's work as a masterpiece that was ahead of its time. Oreo was republished again in 2015 by New Directions and in England in 2018 by Picador.
