= Harryette Mullen =

American poet

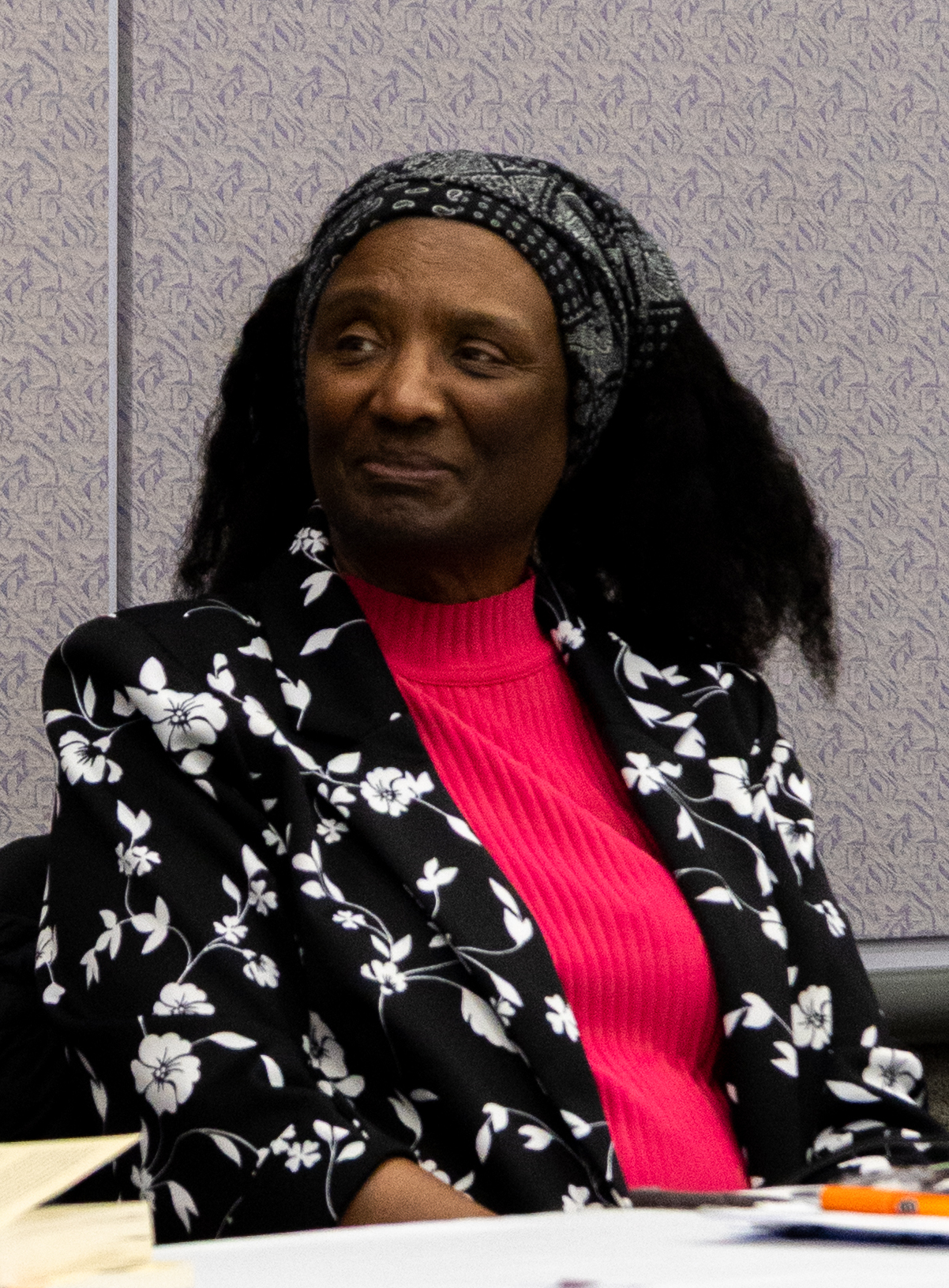
- Mullen at AWP 2025
- Born: July 1, 1953 (age 73); Florence, Alabama, United States
- Education: University of Texas at Austin
- Occupations: English professor, poet, writer
- Employer: University of California, Los Angeles
- Awards: Gertrude Stein Award

Harryette Mullen (born July 1, 1953), Professor of English at University of California, Los Angeles, is an American poet, short story writer, and literary scholar.

== Life ==
Mullen was born in Florence, Alabama, grew up in Fort Worth, Texas, graduated from the University of Texas at Austin, and attended graduate school at the University of California, Santa Cruz. As of 2008, she lives in Los Angeles, California. Mullen's most recent work is Urban Tumbleweed: Notes from a Tanka Diary.

Mullen began to write poetry as a college student in a multicultural community of writers, artists, musicians, and dancers in Austin, Texas. As an emerging poet, Mullen received a literature award from the Black Arts Academy, a Dobie-Paisano writer’s fellowship from the Texas Institute of Letters and University of Texas, and an artist residency from the Helene Wurlitzer Foundation of New Mexico. In Texas, she worked in the Artists in Schools program before enrolling in graduate school in California where she continued her study of American literature and encountered even more diverse communities of writers and artists.

Mullen was influenced by the social, political, and cultural movements of African Americans, Mexican Americans, and women in the 1960s and '70s, including the Civil Rights Movement, the Black Power movement, the Black Arts Movement, the Chicano Movement, and feminism. Her first book, Tree Tall Woman, which showed traces of all of these influences, was published in 1981.

Especially in her later books, Trimmings, S*PeRM**K*T, Muse & Drudge, and Sleeping with the Dictionary, Mullen frequently combines cultural critique with humor and wordplay as her poetry grapples with topics such as globalization, mass culture, consumerism, and the politics of identity. Critics, including Elisabeth Frost and Juliana Spahr, have suggested that Mullen’s poetry audience is an eclectic community of collaborative readers who share individual and collective interpretations of poems that may provoke multiple, divergent, or contradictory meanings, according to each reader’s cultural background.

Mullen has taught at Cornell University and currently teaches courses in American poetry, African-American literature, and creative writing at the University of California, Los Angeles. While living in Ithaca and Rochester, New York, she was a faculty fellow of the Cornell University Society for the Humanities and a Rockefeller fellow at the Susan B. Anthony Institute at University of Rochester.

She has received a Gertrude Stein Award for innovative poetry, a Katherine Newman Award for best essay on U.S. ethnic literature, a Foundation for Contemporary Arts Grants to Artists award (2004), and a fellowship from the John Simon Guggenheim Memorial Foundation. Her poetry collection, Sleeping with the Dictionary (2002), was a finalist for a National Book Award, National Book Critics Circle Award, and Los Angeles Times Book Prize. She received a PEN/Beyond Margins Award for her Recyclopedia (2006). She is also credited for rediscovering the novel Oreo, published in 1974 by Fran Ross. Mullen won the fourth annual Jackson Poetry Prize from Poets & Writers in 2010.

She appears in the documentary film The Black Candle, directed by M. K. Asante Jr. and narrated by Maya Angelou.

== Background ==
Mullen has stated that she was brought up in Fort Worth, Texas, but that her family is originally from Pennsylvania. Growing up in such a small black community was hard especially because, as Mullen has said in interviews, "a black Southern vernacular was spoken, which my family didn't speak." This created a division between Mullen and her peers who considered her an outsider for speaking "white."

== Work ==
=== Poetry collections ===
- Tree Tall Woman, 1981
- Trimmings, 1991
- S*PeRM**K*T, 1992
- Muse & Drudge, 1995
- Sleeping with the Dictionary, 2002
- Blues Baby: Early Poems, 2002
- Recyclopedia: Trimmings, S*PeRM**K*T, Muse and Drudge, 2006
- Urban Tumbleweed: Notes from a Tanka Diary, 2013
- Broken Glish: Five Prose Poems, 2013
- Open Leaves: Poems from Earth, 2023
- Regaining Unconsciousness. August 5, 2025. ISBN 978-1-64445-349-0.

=== Critical essays and books ===
- "Runaway Tongue: Resistant Orality in Uncle Tom’s Cabin, Incidents in the Life of a Slave Girl, Our Nig, and Beloved", The Culture of Sentiment, 1992
- "Optic White: Blackness and the Production of Whiteness", Diacritics, 1994; reprinted in Cultural and Literary Critiques of the Concept of 'Race', 1997
- "'A Silence Between Us Like a Language': The Untranslatability of Experience in Sandra Cisneros' Woman Hollering Creek", MELUS Journal, 1996
- "Incessant Elusives: the Oppositional Poetics of Erica Hunt and Will Alexander," "Holding their Own: Perspectives on the Multi-Ethnic Literatures of the United States", 2000.
- "African Signs and Spirit Writing", Callaloo, 1996; reprinted in African American Literary Theory: A Reader, 2000, and The Black Studies Reader, 2004
- "'Apple Pie with Oreo Crust': Fran Ross’s Recipe for an Idiosyncratic American Novel", MELUS Journal, 2002
- "'Artistic Expression was Flowing Everywhere': Alison Mills and Ntozake Shange, Black Bohemian Feminists in the 1970s", Meridians, 2004
- The Cracks Between What We Are and What We Are Supposed To Be: Essays and Interviews (University of Alabama Press), 2012

=== Collaboration ===
In 2011, Barbara Henning published a collection of postcard interviews with the author, titled: Looking Up Harryette Mullen (Belladonna). In it, Mullen writes, "Poetry, in general, is a rule-breaking activity."
