= Ricardo Khan =

American playwright and theater director

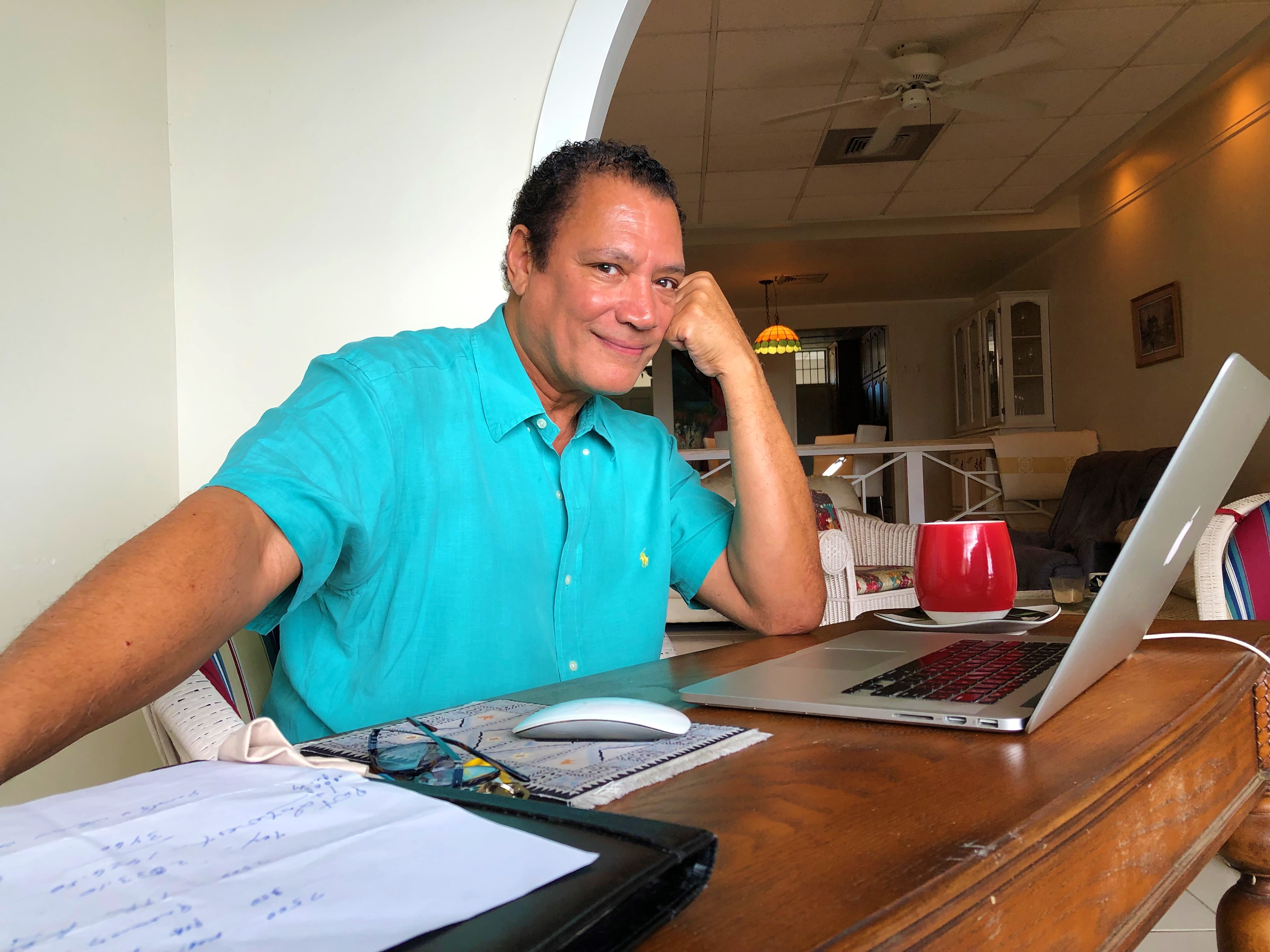
- Kahn in 2019
- Born: November 4, 1951 (age 74); Washington, D.C., US
- Other name: Rick
- Occupations: Playwright; theater director
- Known for: Crossroads Theatre

Ricardo "Rick" Khan (born November 4, 1951) is an American playwright and theater director of African and Indian descent. He co-founded the Tony Award-winning and highly influential Crossroads Theatre of New Jersey, and is an acclaimed director on both American and International stages. As a writer, Khan saw his first play, Fly, premiered in 2007 at Lincoln Center Institute of Lincoln Center in New York and then at Crossroads, go on to win multiple NAACP Theater Awards in 2018. The play, co-authored with writer Trey Ellis and directed by Khan, has been lauded as a highly innovative and moving theatrical play that makes use of many mediums to tell the story and the trials and triumphs of American World War II heroes, the Tuskegee Airmen. Other plays written or co-written by Khan include Satchel Paige and the Kansas City Swing, Freedom Rider, and Letters From Freedom Summer.

== Early life and education ==
Ricardo Khan was born in Washington, D.C., on November 4, 1951, the first of five children of Mustapha Khan, an Indo-Trinidadian US immigrant from Trinidad and Tobago, and his wife Jacqueline (née Driver), from a middle class African American family in Philadelphia. They met as students at Howard University, Mustapha for medicine and Jacqueline for nursing. The family eventually settled in Camden, New Jersey, where Mustapha had a well-regarded medical practice as a family doctor for over 50 years, and Jacqueline, while raising the children and taking take of family, also continued to practice professionally as an educator and volunteer nurse in the community. Following Dr. Khan's death in 2009, an outpouring of love and respect resulted in a street being named after him, Dr. Mustapha M. Khan Way.

Ricardo's schooling was almost entirely in Quaker schools, while his growing up was primarily in city neighborhoods of Philadelphia and Camden, NJ. His parents were active in the American civil rights movement and social advocates for change and self improvement in their communities. Khan and his siblings were also involved in a number of youth groups growing up, including the Cub Scouts, Boy Scouts, Little League Baseball, the black church and the YMCA, and the South Jersey chapter of Jack & Jill, a mothers-led black organization dedicated to exposing their children to education, advocacy, arts and culture, the importance of self-awareness and a life of giving back. On one such monthly outing, a day trip from Camden to New York, Khan saw the 1968 Broadway production of Hello Dolly with an all-black cast. and was mesmerized. Shortly after that, he became active in his high school drama department, a decision that would set in motion a life course of using the arts and the power of live performance as his tool for prompting social change and the development of a mutual respect and understanding among peoples of differing backgrounds in this society and the world.

He studied psychology as a Rutgers College undergrad, graduating in 1973 with honors. He went on for graduate theater studies at the Mason Gross School of the Arts at Rutgers University, and earned a double MFA in both acting and directing in 1977.

== Career ==
Not long after graduating, with L. Kenneth Richardson whom he knew from graduate studies, Khan founded Crossroads Theater in New Brunswick, New Jersey, in 1978. Khan and Richardson had fleshed out the idea for the company in a restaurant and wrote their mission on a napkin: To change the too-limiting environment of black theater of that day, and encourage a bolder, more real and more human professional existence in the arts for African-American theater artists.

Khan served first as Co-founder/Producer and executive director of Crossroads, and then as its artistic director beginning in the late '80s, developing, staging and commissioning plays by African-American playwrights for fully developed, well-rounded and truthful African-American characters and stories. During his tenure the company introduced several revolutionary American plays, including works by August Wilson, George C. Wolfe, Rita Dove, Mbongeni Ngema, Harold Scott, Ruby Dee and Ntozake Shange. American theater icon, innovator, director and playwright Joseph Papp called Crossroads one of his two favorite theaters. Crossroads won a Tony Award for Outstanding Regional Theater in 1999, the first to ever be awarded to an American Black theatre company.

In the process of retiring from Crossroads, Khan told the New York Times: ''To a certain degree, forming Crossroads was about trying to change the world. But it was really, really about wanting to play a part in the world's turning—not just out on its side or margins, but actual a part of an artistic world that turns to glorify the human spirit. That's what we were about then, and that's what we're about now."

In December 1999, Khan left his company to begin a one-year sabbatical in Trinidad and Tobago, his father's birthplace, which later took him to South Africa in search of a new, more global language and way of addressing the African American experience and attendant psycho-sociological challenges of trying to live a free life while black in America. He believed that the new way could come only from a new, more global self-view of the African American and his condition in the context of a global self-definition.

While he was abroad, Crossroads unexpectedly closed its doors for a season, in 2000, overwhelmed by a one-and-a-half to two million US dollars' debt. and to decide on its next organizational direction and leadership. Crossroads was eventually revived, and in 2003, asked Khan to return to help re-open the theatre, albeit on a smaller scale than before. Since then, Crossroads has continued to produce as an undeniable force in the American Theatre. And as Artistic Director Emeritus, Khan remains active as a creative advisor.

Since 1999, Khan has been a freelance director with artistic homes in New York at Lincoln Center, in Washington, DC at the John F. Kennedy Center for the Performing Arts, and in Kansas City where he was a Visiting Professor for the professional graduate training program at the University of Missouri from 2008 to 2018. He also lived for periods of time in Trinidad and South Africa, and started an international collective of writers called The World Theatre Lab, based simultaneously in New York, London and Johannesburg.

In 2005, with a commission by Lincoln Center's Lincoln Center Institute for an original new play, Khan began writing. His first, Fly, was co-written with Trey Ellis. But it was originally inspired years before by the stories Khan heard of the Tuskegee Airmen of Work War II, upon which he developed the pay, Black Eagles, in 1989 at Crossroads with playwright Leslie Lee. Khan directed Black Eagles for Crossroads, the Ford's Theatre in Washington, DC, and Manhattan Theatre Club in New York, and recalled that after he first learned of the African-American fighter pilots and began working on the play, he discovered that he was related to one of them, his mother's cousin Elwood T. "Woody" Driver who was one of the original Tuskegee Airman. Roscoe C. Brown, another original Tuskegee Airman[2], served as chief advisor to Khan in both Black Eagles and Fly until his death in 2016.

Fly's debut at Lincoln Center in 2007 was as a 60-minute play, where Khan sought an almost video-game like stage style and also engaged a "tap griot" character—a tap dancer whose role was similar to a Greek chorus and portrayed the emotions and parts of the story the airmen were not allowed to express—It was a way to reach younger audiences on their aesthetic level. But after the 2009 inauguration of President Barack H. Obama where the Tuskegee Airmen were honored as special guests., Khan and Ellis incorporated that historic event and developed their script into a full-length play for all ages, which premiered in the fall of 2009 at Crossroads. Since then, across the country Fly has been professionally produced several times. Its 2017 New York staging, a co-production between Crossroads, the Pasadena Playhouse and the New Victory Theatre in NY was nominated for eight 2018 NAACP Theater Awards, winning three: Best Production, Best Lighting and Best Choreography.

In 2013, Khan teamed up with Trey Ellis again to write Satchel Paige and the Kansas City Swing, a play about Jazz and Negro leagues baseball set against the backdrop of America in 1945, the year Jackie Robinson broke the color barrier in the major leagues, and when the country was in the beginnings of the integration movement. Like Fly, Satchel Paige and the Kansas City Swing premiered at Crossroads before going on to major productions across the country.

In 2015, Khan conceived of a multi-narrative play, Freedom Rider, which evolved into an extraordinary collaboration with four other writers, Kathleen McGhee-Anderson, Murray Horwitz, Nathan Louis Jackson and Nikkole Salter, involving an interracial group of college students on a bus headed south in 1961. In 2018, as a sequel to Freedom Rider, Khan partnered with Denise Nicholas and South African born writer Sibusiso Mamba, on Letters From Freedom Summer, set in 1964 during the struggle for voting rights in Mississippi.

In 2016 Khan served as producer and director of the highly acclaimed opening night gala ceremonies for the Smithsonian's new National Museum of African American History and Culture in Washington, DC on September 24 of that year, involving performers and creatives that included Yolanda Adams, Daniel Beaty, Dave Chappelle and Frederic Yonnet, Ava DuVernay, Savion Glover, Oprah Winfrey and Stevie Wonder.

Khan holds an MFA in both acting and directing from Mason Gross School of the Arts, and an Honorary Doctorate from Rutgers University where he is also in the university's Hall of Distinguished Alumni. He has also served on the Board of Theatre Communications Group, the national organization of America's professional theatres, and from 1995 to 1998, was the organization's president.
