= Post-soul =

The term post-soul was coined by Nelson George in a 1992 Village Voice feature article, "Buppies, B-boys, BAPS, and Bohos." The article contained a chronology of significant shifts in African-American culture since the 1970s, exemplified by Melvin Van Peebles, Muhammad Ali, Stevie Wonder, and James Brown. In 2005, George reworked his chronology in a book entitled Post Soul Nation: The Explosive, Contradictory, Triumphant, and Tragic 1980s as Experienced by African Americans (Previously Known as Blacks and Before That Negroes). Unlike the wider scope of George's original Village Voice article, Post-Soul Nation focuses on the 1980s to describe a series of political, social, and cultural shifts which helped reshape the African-American experience in the United States after the civil-rights era.

Post-soul opposes the soul era, emphasizing the effects of civil rights-era advancements. The soul era, like the civil rights movement, emphasized a unified black identity and experience. In contrast, the post-soul era recognized many expressions of blackness related to individuality, sexuality, gender, and class. These diverse expressions contributed to the formation of a new black aesthetic, a term coined by scholar Trey Ellis. The post-soul era defined a period in which black visibility was rapidly expanding; however, lower-class black communities did not have the same opportunities as the emerging black middle class.

== Overview ==
In the original chronology of the post-soul era, the event that sparked George's curiosity and development of the term was the release of Melvin Van Peebles' Sweet Sweetback's Baadasssss Song. The 1971 film told the story of a Watts-based hustler whose goal was to obtain freedom and combat police brutality.

The unwillingness to conform to the white narrative in the early 1970s created a trickle-down effect that influenced filmmakers such as Spike Lee and rappers such as Ice Cube. After publishing the chronology in 1992, George published Buppies, B-boys, BAPS, and Bohos: Notes on Post-Soul Black Culture. He then published Post Soul Nation: The Explosive, Contradictory, Triumphant, and Tragic 1980s as Experienced by African Americans (Previously Known as Blacks and Before That Negroes), which omitted the 1971-1978 from the post-soul chronology and focused on the 1979-1989 decade as the years of the "Post-Soul Nation".

George uses the term "post-soul" in his chronologies (also known as the "post-civil rights era") to contrast it with the soul era, which derives from the definition of soul and its association with spirituality and religion. According to George, the soul era embodied this association and was characterized by optimism and faith in the future and those who would inhabit it. In addition to being a spiritual era, the soul era was influenced by activists and revolutionary leaders such as Martin Luther King Jr. and Malcolm X. Through the efforts, triumphs, and histories of the soul era and its revolutionaries, the post-soul era developed an ideology of the black experience with its own triumphs and challenges.

The post-soul era, in contrast to the soul era, was characterized by an increased presence and acceptance of blackness in American popular culture. The increased presence of the black image brought to the forefront different representations of what being black in America looked like. Instead of a singular definition of what blackness looked like similar to the sou-era definition of blackness), the post-soul era diversified the definition.

Blackness was diversified in socioeconomic status, ideology, and expression. The black middle class grew, which led to the economic stratification of the black community. The black middle class prospered, but the black lower class did not share in the wealth and were impacted by crises such as HIV/AIDS, increased poverty, police brutality, and educational inequality. Plagued by poverty and AIDS and simultaneously uplifted, George (quoting Charles Dickens in A Tale of Two Cities) described the post-soul era as the "best of times and the worst of times".

Authors Bertram D. Ashe and Anthony Neal understood the post-soul era as the generation of black artists and writers who emerged after the civil-rights movement, missing its impact. Ashe explores the era by describing its themes and tropes: the exploration of blackness, the archetype of the cultural mulatto, and allusion and disruption relative to the civil-rights era.

== Characteristics ==
Post-soul artists came of age during (or after) the civil-rights movement. The soul era tried to emphasize a unified black experience, but post-soul artists embraced diverse experiences of blackness; writers focused on the experiences of black people who grew up in integrated schools and communities, or who integrated spaces themselves. Some writers and filmmakers employed blaxploitation, identifying and critiquing older stereotypes of black people.

== Influences ==
The post-soul era characterized a major shift in how black artists thought about their work. This transition is apparent in its contrast with the Black Arts Movement, an artistic corollary to the soul era which endeavored to define a unified black aesthetic. Civil-rights-era advocacy exposed children to spaces and opportunities which had been reserved for white Americans. Trey Ellis, a post-soul writer and thinker, coined the term "cultural mulatto" to describe children of the post-integration period who could navigate black and white cultures; however, the term has been criticized by post-soul authors Weheliye and Martha Southgate. Many post-soul artists differentiated their artistic style from that of their predecessors with an unwillingness to have their work defined as black art and a re-imagination of the forms black identity could take.

=== Literature ===
In a cultural movement defined by a recognition of the ambiguity and contradiction of African-American, the post-soul era's impact on literature is far-reaching. This cultural shift signified an expansion of whose voices and stories could be seen as authentically black.

==== Womanhood ====
Post-soul literature differentiated itself from its predecessors by expanding the scope of African-American literature to include mainstream works which centered on black female identity. These works gave black women authors an opportunity to reflect on the intersection of identities which often left them vulnerable to discrimination by white systems and mistreatment by black men. The portrayal of male characters was debated, and authors such as Ntozake Shange, Alice Walker and Terry McMillan were criticized for airing community problems and vilifying black men for a white audience.

==== Middle-class identity ====
Due to the growth of the African-American middle class during the post-soul era, some authors explored the ways that socioeconomic and racial identities interact in American society. Cultural critics, authors, and academics pointed out that the benefits of the civil-rights era were not distributed equally among black people, and policies such as affirmative action left large numbers of working-class African Americans behind.

=== Media ===
Defining media as the mainstream auditory and visual art produced in the Post-Soul era, this time period witnessed transformations in the ways that Americans interacted with African American music, film, and other entertainment forms like sports.

==== Hip hop ====
In defining the cultural importance of the post-soul era, George identifies hip hop as one of its most influential changes. During this period, hip hop transitioned from a subculture of marginalized poor black communities during the 1970s to a mainstream genre of American music and a flourishing subculture which included fashion, dancing, and graffiti. Mark Anthony Neal characterizes hip hop as a search for authenticity and a reflection of the experiences of poor black Americans and a contradictory preoccupation with creating an image centered on material gain and external toughness.

==== Black-comic popularity ====
The post-soul era saw the increased popularity of black comedians such as Eddie Murphy and Arsenio Hall. Older black comedians (including Bill Cosby and Richard Pryor) still played a significant role in shaping public opinion about comedy, appearing on television and in films during the period.
