= Cultural mulatto =

Highly educated black person, according to Trey Ellis

The cultural mulatto is a concept introduced by Trey Ellis in his 1989 essay "The New Black Aesthetic". While the term "mulatto" typically refers to a person of mixed black and white ancestry, a cultural mulatto is defined by Ellis as a black person who is highly educated and usually a part of the middle or upper-middle class, and therefore assimilates easily into traditionally white environments.

== Overview ==
Ellis writes: "Just as a genetic mulatto is a black person of mixed parents who can often get along fine with his white grandparents, a cultural mulatto, educated by a multi-racial mix of cultures, can also navigate easily in the white world" (235). Cultural mulattoes are skillful code-switchers (alternating between multiple languages during conversation) and they may be equally comfortable around blacks as around whites. Members of the New Black Aesthetic are typically cultural mulattoes. Their ability for easy interaction with both blacks and whites is what ultimately allows cultural mulattoes opportunities for class and status upward mobility.

== Examples ==
Examples of cultural mulattoes offered by Ellis include:

- Bill Cosby's daughters
- Barack Obama
- Lisa Jones, Yale alumna and founder of Rodeo Caldonia (a performance art group for black women)
- Kellie Jones, Visual Arts Director of the Jamaica (Queens) Arts Center
