= Danzy Senna =

American writer (born 1970)

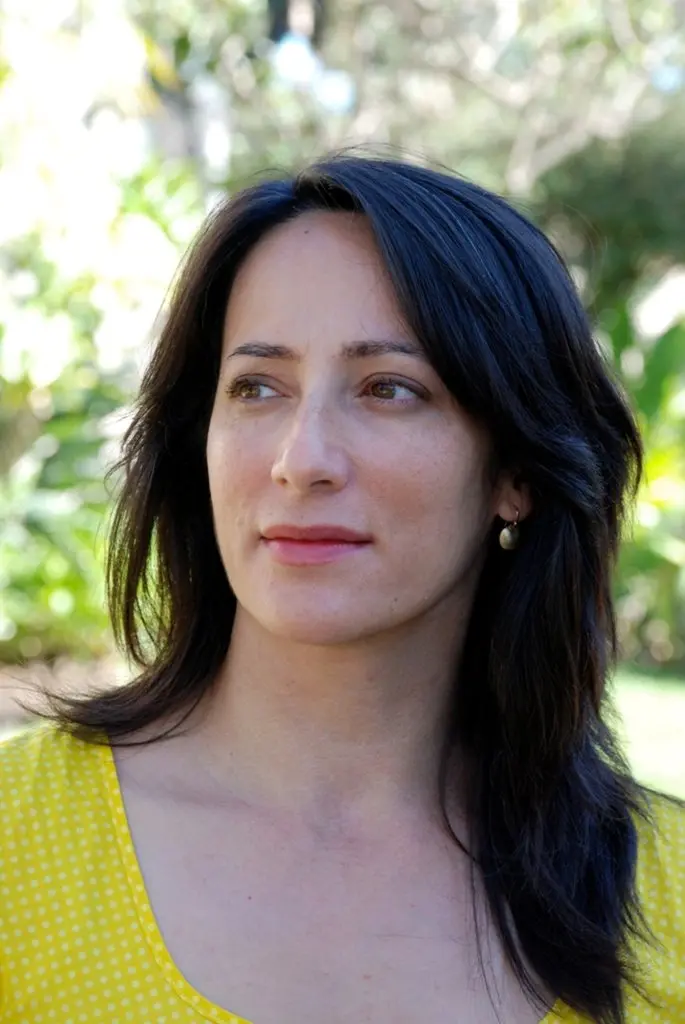
- Born: 1970 (age 55–56); Boston, Massachusetts, U.S.
- Education: Elma Lewis School of Fine Arts; Stanford University (BA); University of California, Irvine (MFA)
- Occupations: Novelist, essayist, professor
- Employer: University of Southern California
- Spouse: Percival Everett
- Children: 2
- Parent(s): Fanny Howe and Carl Senna
- Writing career
- Period: Contemporary
- Genres: Fiction, non-fiction
- Notable work: Caucasia (1998)
- Notable awards: Dos Passos Prize (2017)
- Website: www.danzysenna.com

Danzy Senna (born September 13, 1970) is an American novelist and essayist. She is the author of six books and numerous essays about race, gender and American identity, including Caucasia (1998), Symptomatic (2003), New People (2017), and most recently Colored Television (2024). Her writing has appeared in The New Yorker, The Atlantic, Vogue, and The New York Times. She is a professor of English at the University of Southern California.

== Early life and education ==
Danzy Senna was born and raised in Boston, Massachusetts, the middle child of three. Senna is the daughter of an interracial couple—a white mother and a Black father—who came from markedly different class backgrounds. Senna's mother, the late poet and novelist Fanny Howe, was the daughter of Mark DeWolfe Howe, who taught at his alma mater, Harvard Law School, and Mary Manning, an Irish playwright and writer who emigrated from Dublin to the United States in 1935.

Senna's father is Carl Senna, a former editor at Beacon Press, and teacher at Tufts University. He edited The Fallacy of IQ, (1973) a scholarly work on racial bias and standardized testing, and is the author of The Black Press and the Struggle for Civil Rights (1993). He was raised by his mother, a Black jazz piano player, but never knew his father, a Mexican boxer. Born in Louisiana, Senna lived for a portion of his childhood in Montgomery, Alabama, and was 10 years old when his mother moved to Boston with him and his sibling. There they lived in a Roxbury housing project.

Senna's parents married in 1968. Senna, the second child, was born in 1970. The couple divorced in 1976. Senna has an older sister and younger brother.

Growing up, Senna and her siblings spent time with each of their parents. As Senna later noted in an interview related to publication of her memoir, Where Did You Sleep Last Night? (2009), their father wanted "to hammer racial consciousness home to his three light-skinned children"; all have identified as Black.

In her early years, Senna attended Boston Public Schools, and the Elma Lewis School of Fine Arts in Roxbury, an independent school founded to provide Boston's Black community with an education in the arts. She and her sister are both alumni of METCO, Boston's racial desegregation busing program. Senna graduated from Brookline High School in 1988.

Senna earned her BA degree in American Studies from Stanford University. She wrote her honors thesis on the works of writers Nella Larsen, James Weldon Johnson, and William Faulkner. She received her MFA in creative writing from the University of California, Irvine, where she wrote her first novel, Caucasia (1998). It has won awards and become required reading for some college courses.

== Brooklyn and career ==
She returned east after graduate school and lived in Brooklyn, New York, for many years in the 1990s. She wrote for magazines and also taught at Sarah Lawrence College. She has said that the atmosphere in Fort Greene inspired some of her later writing for New People (2017), set in 1990s Brooklyn and described as "a mordantly funny social satire with a thriller edge."

== Return to California ==
She left New York in 2005 for Southern California, where she has lived since. She teaches at the University of Southern California, and has written novels, memoirs, and essays.

She is married to the novelist Percival Everett. They have two sons and live near Los Angeles.

She wrote the introduction for the New Directions edition of My Search for Warren Harding after reading the novel while housebound during early covid.

== Works ==
=== Caucasia ===
Senna's first novel, Caucasia (1998), is narrated by a young biracial girl, Birdie Lee, who is taken into the political underground by her mother, and forced to live under an assumed identity. The coming of age story follows Birdie's struggle for identity and her search for the missing parts of her family. The novel received the Book of the Month Club's Stephen Crane Award for First Fiction, was nominated for the Orange Prize for Fiction, and won the Alex Award from the American Library Association. It was also longlisted for the International Dublin Literary Award and was named a Los Angeles Times "Best Book of the Year". Caucasia, a national bestseller, has been translated into twelve languages.

=== Symptomatic ===
Her second novel, Symptomatic (2004), is a psychological thriller narrated by an unnamed young woman who moves to New York City for what promises to be a dream job – a prestigious fellowship writing for a respected magazine. The narrator feels displaced, however, and is unsure of how she fits into the world around her. She becomes the object of an older woman's attention after they bond over their similarly mixed heritage. As the older woman's interest turns into obsession, the narrator must figure out what their relationship means to her, even as both of their lives seem to spiral out of control.

=== Where Did You Sleep Last Night? ===
Senna's two novels were followed by the memoir Where Did You Sleep Last Night?: A Personal History (2009). She recounts the story of her parents, who married in 1968. Her mother is a white woman with a blue-blood Bostonian lineage. Her father is of African-American and Mexican descent, the son of a single mother and an unknown father. Senna recalls her father being determined "to hammer racial consciousness home to his three light-skinned children." Decades later, Senna looks back not only at her parents’ divorce, but at the family histories they tried so hard to overcome. Her often painful journey through the past is epitomized by the question posed to her as a young child by her father: "Don’t you know who I am?"

=== You Are Free ===
Senna's short-story collection, You Are Free (2011), was described by Kirkus Reviews as, "Deft, revealing stories [from] a writer for our time...a fresh, insightful look into being young, smart and biracial in postmillennial America." In the title story, a woman's strange correspondence with a girl claiming to be her daughter leads her into the doubts and what-ifs of the life she hasn't lived. In "The Care of the Self," a new mother hosts an old friend, still single, and discovers how each of them pities and envies the other. In the collection's first story, "Admission", tensions arise between a liberal husband and wife after their son is admitted into the elite daycare school to which they’d applied only on a lark.

=== New People ===
Senna's 2017 book, New People, tells the story of mixed-race Maria and her fiancé Khalil, who live together in '90s in Brooklyn neighborhood Fort Greene, then populated by black artists and bohemians. Their seemingly perfect "King and Queen of the Racially Nebulous Prom" image is troubled by Maria's fixation on a local black poet she barely knows. The novel was in part inspired by Senna's fascination with the Jonestown massacre. The New Yorker praised the novel for making "keen, icy farce of the affectations of the Brooklyn black faux-bohemia." Time listed the novel as one of the Top Ten Novels of the year.

=== Colored Television ===
Senna's most recent novel, Colored Television (2024), is about a biracial novelist, Jane, writing the "mulatto War and Peace," who decides to abandon her art to pursue a career in television writing. The novel was chosen as a Good Morning America Book Club pick for September 2024. Ron Charles of The Washington Post wrote: "Senna unfurls a novel that somehow deconstructs its own racial preoccupations, as though she's riding a unicycle up and down a set of Escher staircases.... The way [she] keeps this wry story aloft may be the closest paper can come to levitation." The book was lauded by the Los Angeles Times in a review that said: "This is the New Great American Novel.... Danzy Senna has set the standard." In a starred review, Kirkus Reviews called the novel, "brilliant, of-the-moment, just really almost perfect". Colored Television was listed as one of the 28 Best Books of Fall 2024 by Oprah Daily, where reviewer Charley Burlock noted, "With her sharp eye and take-no-prisoners humor, Senna exposes both the specific absurdities of the publishing world and the universal absurdities of trying—and inevitably failing—to have it all." The novel was also selected as one of The New York Times Notable Books of 2024, and the Globe and Mail named it as one of the best books of the year that "entertained, informed and delighted us".

== Awards and honors ==
=== Honors ===
- 2025: PEN Oakland/Josephine Miles Literary Award
- 2025: American Book Award
- 2025: Anisfield-Wolf Book Award
- 2017: Dos Passos Prize
- 2004: Fellow, New York Public Library's Cullman Center for Scholars and Writers
- 2002: Whiting Award

=== Literary awards ===
Year	Title	Award	Category	Result	Ref.
1999	Caucasia	Alex Award	—	Won	
2000	Caucasia	International Dublin Literary Award	—	Longlisted	
2001	Caucasia	Women's Prize for Fiction	—	Longlisted	
2010	Where Did You Sleep Last Night?	Dayton Literary Peace Prize	Nonfiction	Longlisted	
2011	You Are Free	California Book Awards	Fiction	Finalist	
2012	You Are Free	Hurston/Wright Legacy Award	Fiction	Nominated	
2018	New People	Joyce Carol Oates Literary Prize	—	Longlisted	
2025	Colored Television	American Book Awards	—	Won	
2025	Colored Television	PEN Oakland/Josephine Miles Literary Award	—	Won	

== Books ==
- Caucasia, 1998. Riverhead Books: New York. ISBN 9781573220910.
- Symptomatic: A Novel, 2003. Riverhead Books: New York. ISBN 9781573222754.
- Where Did You Sleep Last Night?: A Personal History, 2009. Farrar, Straus and Giroux: New York. ISBN 9780374289157.
- You Are Free: Stories, 2011. Riverhead Books: New York. ISBN 9781594485077.
- New People, 2017. Riverhead Books: New York. ISBN 9781594487095.
- Colored Television, 2024. Riverhead Books: New York. ISBN 9780593544372.
