= Crossroads Theatre =

Theater company based in New Brunswick, New Jersey, U.S.

Coordinates: 40°29′36.9″N 74°26′38.11″W

Crossroads Theatre is an American residence theater company in New Brunswick, New Jersey, focused on the Black American experience and the African diaspora. It is in residence at the newly built New Brunswick Performing Arts Center, which opened in the city's Civic Square in 2019.

== Theatre Company ==
Crossroads Theater, as a Black theater company, is focused on celebrating the culture, artistry and voices of the African Diaspora. Founded in 1978, it was the winner of the 1999 Regional Theatre Tony Award.

=== History ===
Ricardo Khan and Lee K. Richardson met at Rutgers University while studying for their Masters of Fine Art degree. After graduating in 1977, they founded the company in 1978. With help from George Street Playhouse and grant money from the CETA program, the theater began performing in New Brunswick and became New Jersey's first professional Black repertory theatre. By 1985, it was thriving and had 1,300 subscribers.

The company made an effort to appeal to a multiracial audience and while it started out focusing more on revivals, by 1985 Artistic Director Lee Richardson was prioritizing new plays, saying: "it's time to focus on the new."

In 2000, it unexpectedly ceased operations temporarily, but with the return of Rick Khan and help in retiring its debt it was able to resume operations.

Since its founding, Crossroads has produced more than 100 works, many of which were premiere productions by African and African-American artists.

Crossroads' world premieres include The Colored Museum, which originated at Crossroads in 1986 and was then seen by millions on national public television, when it was produced for WNET's "Great Performances", and Spunk, both by Tony Award-winner George C. Wolfe.

=== Legacy ===
The American Theatre Critics Association together with the American Theatre Wing and the League of American Theatres and Producers presented the 1999 Tony Award for Outstanding Regional Theatre to Crossroads in recognition of 20 years of artistic excellence.

More than 50 new plays have premiered at Crossroads, including works by such artists as August Wilson, Anna Deavere Smith, George C. Wolfe, Ntozake Shange, Migdalia Cruz, Ruby Dee, Ossie Davis, Linda Nieves-Powell, former US Poet Laureate Rita Dove and South African writer/composer Mbongeni Ngema.

=== Productions ===
Since its founding, Crossroads has produced more than 100 works, including many premiere productions by African and African-American artists. Crossroads' productions include:

- The Colored Museum (by George C. Wolfe), (world premiere) originated at Crossroads in 1986 and later appeared on television as one of WNETs "Great Performances"
- Spunk, by George C. Wolfe (world premiere)
- Jitney by August Wilson.
- Fly by Trey Ellis and Ricardo Khan October, 2009 (world premiere)
- It Ain't Nothin' But the Blues by Ron Taylor, Lita Gaithers, "Mississippi" Charles Bevels, Randal Myler, and Dan Wheetman.
- The Love Space Demands, Ntozake Shange's choreopoem
- Black Eagles by Leslie Lee, a historic chronicle of the Tuskegee Airmen of World War II
- Sheila's Day, the cultural collaboration of six South African and six African-American women, written by Sarafina! creator Mbongeni Ngema, that toured the US. Britain and South Africa after its run on the Crossroads stage
- And Further'Mo, the worldwide hit musical by Vernel Bagneris
- The Darker Face of the Earth, former U.S. Poet Laureate Rita Dove's first play,
- Lost Creek Township by Charlotte A. Gibson
- Flyin' West, written by Pearl Cleage and starring Ruby Dee (Kennedy Center) and Trazana Beverley and Olivia Cole
- Nomathemba, a musical by Ntozake Shange and Joseph Shabalala, founder and leader of Grammy Award-winning South African recording artists Ladysmith Black Mambazo
- Two Hah Hahs and a Homeboy, written by and starring Ruby Dee together with Ossie Davis and their son, musician Guy Davis.

Crossroads is a member company of the New Jersey Theatre Alliance.
