= Trey Ellis =

American novelist (born 1962)

Trey Ellis (born 1962) is an American novelist, screenwriter, professor, playwright, and essayist. He was born in Washington D.C. and graduated from Hopkins School and Phillips Academy, Andover, where he studied under Alexander Theroux before attending Stanford University, where he was the editor of the Stanford Chaparral and wrote his first novel, Platitudes in a creative writing class taught by Gilbert Sorrentino. He is a professor of Professional Practice in the Graduate School of the Arts at Columbia University.

== Novels and memoirs ==
Ellis's first novel, Platitudes, was published in 1988 and reissued by Northeastern University Press in 2003, along with his 1989 essay "The New Black Aesthetic". Platitudes follows the story of Earle, a black, private high-school student in New York City. The novel itself wrestles with many concepts outlined in "The New Black Aesthetic," namely the existence of the cultural mulatto. Earle, as a second generation middle-class, black nerd, embodies this identity—on his visit to Harlem he feels entirely out of place. Alongside this narrative is the story of Dorothy, a black student at a private high school who lives in Harlem, yet can navigate easily in her mostly white social circles.

The novel makes extensive use of structure. Largely a metafictional work, Ellis moves between a more post-modern, deconstructed style and a more traditional, black female style through the voices of fictional authors Wellington and Ishee Ayam. Ellis' exaggerated representations of each style is humorous, essentially complicating the hegemonic artistic voice of the Black Arts Movement.

As a black nerd, Earle complicates traditional ideas of black masculinity. He occupies a place as an intellectual outsider, excluded from the mainstream, and yet the nerd identity is hyper-white. This idea of how blackness can be diverse and differ from typical ideas blackness accurately depict what the NBA is trying to say.

Ellis is also the author of the novels Home Repairs (1993) and Right Here, Right Now (1999), which received an American Book Award. His latest book is Bedtime Stories: Adventures in the Land of Single-Fatherhood (2008), a memoir of his life as a single father of two.

== Film ==
His work for the screen includes the Peabody Award-winning and Emmy-nominated The Tuskegee Airmen, and Good Fences, starring Danny Glover and Whoopi Goldberg, which was shortlisted for the PEN award for Best Teleplay of the year, and was nominated for a Black Reel award. In 1994, he co-wrote The Inkwell under the pen name Tom Ricostronza.

== Essays ==
His essays have appeared in The New York Times, Playboy, The Washington Post, The Los Angeles Times and GQ, among other places. He is a regular blogger on The Huffington Post and lives in Manhattan, where he is an associate professor at the Columbia University Graduate School of Film.

== Plays ==
His work for the theater includes the plays Fly, Satchel Paige and the Kansas City Swing and Holy Mackerel.

Holy Mackerel had its first staged reading in 2016. The play follows the evolution of The Amos 'n' Andy Show, which ran from the late 1920s to the late 1950s, and was a household favorite. Before it became a television show, it was America's most listened-to radio show. During the time, it was voiced by white actors, and the show was criticized for the way it "vilified [the characters] as modern-day Uncle Toms for wanting the same opportunities for success that their white counterparts took for granted". However Amos 'n' Andy also "introduc[ed] America to a range of black people who included doctors and lawyers, and depicted the black family at a time when no one else was doing so". When the show moved to television, they hired black actors. After only two seasons, the show was cancelled due to a boycott led by Walter White, head of the NAACP. In Ellis' own words, "When I discovered that everything I thought I knew about Amos 'n' Andy was wrong, that it was one of TV's first ever sitcoms and the all-black cast were some of the most brilliant comedians to ever walk the earth, I knew I had to bring their story back to life". 'Holy Mackerel!', the phrase the show invented, is a comedy about the tragedy of what happened to them."

== The New Black Aesthetic ==
Ellis is also known for the small piece he wrote titled "New Black Aesthetic" (NBA) which describes the change in the overall image of "blackness" that has emerged in American society in the past few decades. In this essay, Ellis argues that there is a broader way to characterize middle class blacks today, and with this new characterization comes a new aesthetic movement.

I now know that I'm not the only black person who sees the black aesthetic as much more than just Africa and jazz. Finally finding a large body of the like-minded armors me with the nearly undampenable enthusiasm of the born again. And my friends and I—a minority's minority mushrooming with the current black bourgeoisie boom—have inherited an open-ended New Black Aesthetic from a few Seventies pioneers that shamelessly borrows and reassembles across both race and class lines.

The NBA represents, in Ellis' mind, a new stage in cultural interaction for black Americans. He does not deny that there are many aspects of American society that still work against the interests of black Americans, but the emergence of the NBA opens up an aesthetic realm that was, until recently, closed to blacks in America. It signals an opening of socially acceptable aesthetic possibilities for blacks beyond "Africa and jazz". Now, for example, black students go to colleges to be art majors rather than always pursuing a law degree or going to medical school upon graduating because their parents have given them the means to do so. In this short piece, Ellis includes interviews from black filmmaker, Spike Lee, as well as the black band, Fishbone. He uses these as examples of thriving hybrids, or people who don't leave behind their culture to be successful. Ellis' novel Platitudes takes advantage of the NBA in order to represent some of the new aesthetic possibilities available to blacks in America. He also talks about the concept of the "cultural mulatto", or someone who can relate to multiple cultures the same way a multiracial person can relate to their different heritages. He refers to Whitney Houston and Lionel Richie as "neutered mutations" that chose to conform and commercialize their once soulful style just so they could maximize their profits by appealing to multiple cultures.

=== Cultural mulatto ===
The phrase, coined by Ellis in his essay "The New Black Aesthetic", (NBA) refers to a black individual who possesses the ability to thrive and successfully exist in a white society while simultaneously maintaining all facets of their complex cultural identity. Ellis signifies two types of cultural mulattoes: "thriving hybrids" and "neutered mutants". The thriving hybrid has transcended the stereotypes associated with blackness and predicates their identity on their individuality as opposed to their blackness. They recognize the position that society has placed on them because of their race, but they don't let it inhibit their growth. Ellis writes: "Just as a genetic mulatto is a black person of mixed parents who can often get along fine with his white grandparents, a cultural mulatto, educated by a multi-racial mix of cultures, can also navigate easily in the white world."

Ellis appropriates the somewhat offensive term mulatto in his creation of rhetoric to describe this contemporary black locus as a means to challenge prevalent notions of multiracial; or in this case, "culturally multiracial", black people falling subject to the fate of the tragic mulatto, or "neutered mutant". The tragic mulatto is an individual who, while struggling to fit into white culture, alienates him or herself from black culture. "Today's cultural mulattoes echo those 'tragic mulattoes' critic Sterling Brown wrote about in the Thirties only when they too forget they are wholly black." While prevalent as a stereotypical figure in 19th- and 20th-century American literature, the tragic mulattoes need not exist in postmodern society. The NBA, as characterized by Ellis, allows space for the cultural mulatto to perform a self-defined, authentic form of identity that does not rely on the self-deluding practice of negating their blackness. Relatedly, the cultural mulatto need not perform a "superblackness" to overcompensate for "acting white" or to gain cultural credibility from the black community. On the converse Ellis also defines the "neutered mutation", a cultural mulatto who tries hard to please both worlds and ends up pleasing neither. Cultural mulattoes exist in great numbers and, fueled by the ideology of the NBA, space for hybridity is opened and, subsequently, feelings of dislocation in a strictly dichotomous society are collectively obliterated.

Through their skills that allow successful navigation in both the white and black social spheres, the cultural mulattoes that typify the NBA are using their access to higher education and various breeds of dominant cultural capital to make "atypically black" art and earn respect devoid of essentialist racial categorizations.

=== Contemporary examples ===
According to B.D. Ashe, this is still the era of the New Black Aesthetic, or what he calls the "Post-soul Aesthetic". Ashe writes, "There has been no fundamental, sociocultural paradigm shift akin to the civil rights movement to alter the post-soul aesthetic focus" or to thrust black Americans into a new way of being and existing. As it is, there are a number of modern examples that emphasize the NBA's persistence through the contemporary moment. Some current examples of this are television shows like Donald Glover's Atlanta or Issa Rae's Insecure. As characters, Issa and "Earn" display an ability to navigate white spaces to varying degrees and embody the idea of the "cultural mulatto". For Issa, this is a common occurrence at her workplace with her boss and white coworkers. For Earn, this is best established in the episode "Juneteenth" in which while at a Juneteenth celebration attended by mostly white people, he and his girlfriend play along with the expectations of the attendees to an almost ludicrous degree. Throughout most of the party, the white people that Earn and his girlfriend interact with are oblivious to their game.

Even further than television, there are examples of artists who exemplify the New Black Aesthetic through mediums such as music. One vocal artist who embodies this idea that blackness can and does exist in a multi-faceted way is Janelle Monae. Specifically, in her album Dirty Computer, Monae gives a voice to the kind of blackness that she embodies as a queer black woman. Janelle Monae doesn't cater to a specific black or white audience, but an audience that can relate to the experiences she speaks of in her music. While many of the songs on Dirty Computer speak of the challenges black people face in America, Monae focuses on these issues in a way that empowers people like herself. She uses her music to empower black queer women when these voices have been historically ignored. Dirty Computer encapsulates Eliss's image of the New Black Aesthetic as a compilation of intersecting black identities that reflect Janelle Monae's existence as a thriving hybrid. Monae expresses this identity clearly in her album, as well as through her personal style and her refusal to conform to anyone's idea of what she should and shouldn't be. This solidifies her place as a trendsetter, rule breaker, and cultural mulatto.

== Platitudes ==
Platitudes is a 1988 metafiction. It tells the tale of competing African-American fictional characters, Dewayne and Isshee, as they struggle to define blackness using two cultural mulatto characters. This novel provides examples of what Ellis describes as New Black Aesthetic in his 1989 essay of the same title.

=== Plot summary ===
Trey Ellis is most famous for his first work of metafiction called Platitudes. The metafictional component of Platitudes helps the reader explore the New Black Aesthetic by portraying one story in which the two fictional authors, Dewayne and Isshee, embody two different ideas and perspectives on how black should be expressed and another story of two characters' struggle to fit into the white world as a "cultural mulatto". In Platitudes, the story begins with an experimental Black writer by the name of Dewayne Wellington. He is trying to figure out how to write his novel. He scoffs at the mainstream image of "authentic blackness" by creating the character Earle, a chubby teenage New Yorker who only thinks about sex (that he is not having) and academics. This is a departure from the stereotypical young black male who is assumed to only care about girls/sex, basketball, and hip hop music. He is in all sense what Ellis calls the cultural mulatto. Earle is a black 16-year-old who lives and attends school in the wealthy neighborhoods of the Upper West Side, Manhattan. While Earle is phenotypically black, he is quite assimilated into white culture. While most of his surroundings and relationships are with white people, Earle is also portrayed as a nerd which is often regarded as having "white" attributes as well as being someone who is intelligent, lacks social skills, and has a hyper-focus on a particular field, in Earle's case that is computer programming. However, Earle tries to explore his black roots when he visits the diner in Harlem where he meets Dorothy for the first time. Dorothy is the attractive female character Dewayne creates. She attends the private St. Rita's School for Girls in Manhattan. Although she lives in inner-city, Harlem, she socializes and attends school on the primarily white side of the city. Dorothy is a part of the popular crowd at school and wants to live the wealthy lifestyle despite her background. Dorothy is considered a "cultural mulatto" because she is someone who is able to thrive in the white world while still embracing her racial identity. She is comfortable among her white friends and even has some power and status among them, but she is also aware of her black identity and how she differs from her them. After asking for advice on how to write his novel, Dewayne encounters Isshee Ayam, an African American feminist writer. She ridicules his works and attempts to "correct" his mistakes by creating her own renditions of the story with more feminist elements. She changes the setting of the story to rural Lowndes County, Georgia as well as most of the characters' traits. As the story goes on, Wellington compromises some of his original ideas to accommodate some of Ayam's preferences. The two narratives of Dewayne and Isshee begin to align as the authors' writing styles and stories reflect each other's styles and beliefs. By altering the story in accordance to both of the authors' writing styles and beliefs of how the black characters should be portrayed, Ellis expresses the concept that there is no one black identity that can be defined. Instead, blackness should be defined separately in the case of each person's life through their interactions with the culture and their experiences. Along with the aligning of the two stories, a relationship buds between Dewayne Wellington and Isshee Ayam. All in all, a majority of the events that happen in the story of Earle and Dorothy are an indirect reflection of the dynamics of Dewayne Wellington's relationship with Isshee Ayam. In the end, as Earle and Dorothy reconnect and consummate their relationship, Isshee and Dewayne do as well when Isshee visits Dewayne in the last chapter of the novel. Ellis uses Isshee's and Dewayne's novel and of two characters who provide examples of the cultural mulatto to portray the "new black aesthetic" and the absence of a single black identity.

=== Analysis ===
In Platitudes, Ellis depicts the tension between two African-American authors, Isshee and Dewayne, as they debate on the proper portrayal of Black characters. Isshee objects to Dewayne's portrayal of Black women, claiming he presented them in an "atavistic" sense, overtly sexualized by Earle, a protagonist in their stories (15). In opposition to Dewayne's story, Isshee recreates his characters as strong, intelligent female characters reinforcing the stereotype of the "Strong Black Woman". Isshee transforms Earle's doting, White mother into a Mammy figure that she calls "Sister Pride" (41). And she endows Dorothy, the other protagonist in their stories, the beautiful, hyper sexualized teen into a girl with "keen intellect"(42). Isshee develops Dorothy into "the first black female J.D.-M.D.-Ph.D. in the history of the land" (42, 43). Through this conflict, Ellis demonstrates the tension that exists in the literary sphere with the transformation of soul literature, Ishee's narrative to post-soul literature, Dewayne's narrative. Isshee recreates the narrative to an "Afro-American glory-stor[y]" while Dewayne gives a modern, sensual take on middle-class African-Americans (19). Isshee's failure to represent other forms of blackness within her literature represents the theme of respectability that existed within the soul era that Dewayne does away with, resembling New Black Aesthetic and Post-Soul Aesthetic.

In Dewayne's narrative of Earle and Dorothy, both belong to the class of the Black post-bourgeoisie. Earle is the son of a working-class white mother. His existence is the product of the civil rights movement which sanctioned the ability for him to live unpunished within the white world of Downtown Harlem. While Dorothy, is a resident of urban Uptown Harlem and the daughter of a restaurateur. She comes from humble beginnings, but she shares the same privileges as Earle able to transverse both white and black worlds and still fit in. Their integration in both worlds indicates their ability to participate socially and culturally as members of both space. Earle and Dorothy are cultural mulattoes, a term coined by Ellis in his essay "The New Black Aesthetic" (NBA). However, Earle and Dorothy are different types of cultural mulattoes. Earle is a neutered mutation, another neologism created by Ellis, mainly "white-cultured" he is able to fit into the white society, downtown Harlem, but he is unable to blend with ease in uptown Harlem, the black world. His inability to blend with the black world is demonstrated by the double consciousness he experiences while in a restaurant in uptown Harlem. He perceives himself through the eyes of others thinking "Stop fooling around and just look mean so they won't know you're not from uptown" (23). His counterpart, Dorothy is a thriving hybrid, another neologism by Ellis, she is capable of blending into the landscapes of both worlds, yet she is still self-conscious of her presence in both spaces. She views Earle and herself as commuters between the two worlds and contemplates the loneliness they share that comes from being interlopers between the two worlds (147).

As a part of Ellis' NBA (also related to Mark Anthony Neal's concept of the post-soul aesthetic), Earle represents a sort of new black male whose narrative is free to explore his non-archetypically "black" conflicts. This NBA tenet is repeatedly evident in the presentation of Earle's relationship to masculinity and the stereotype of black hypermasculinity throughout the novel. Traditionally race and gender intersected in black men to create a hypermasculine archetype; however, Earle is an NBA black male who struggles with understanding and asserting such masculinity in key moments. For example, when Dorothy's boyfriend (hypermasculine LeVon) usurps him as her potential love interest, his response was not aggressive, or even particularly assertive: "I can't believe it. She's not only got a boyfriend but he's Gigantor the Thunder Tyrant. I should've known. She's too beautiful for you fatso, why can't you just settle for a tubby acnehead with halitosis who hates you." (141). The self-deprecation of his physical size and shape relative to LeVon's indicated Earle's internalization of his failure in hypermasculinity. Earle's problematized relationship to masculinity is an example of black literature speaking to the experiences of black people who don't resonate with hypermasculinity—a prime illustration of Ellis' NBA democratization of the black authenticity. This process serves to create a discourse in which black people with non-standard black experiences represented in the NBA and PSA are allowed and encouraged to explore their discomfort with blackness as Earle does.

=== Genre ===
Platitudes is a realistic metafiction, a story within a story. The story of Isshee and Dewayne's correspondence frames the bildungsroman, coming-of-age, narratives about Earle and Dorothy. The novel falls under the genre of New Black Aesthetic, art produced by the post-bourgeoisie Black that portrays cultural hybridity and escapes the boundaries of civil rights literature and their themes of respectability.

=== Structure ===
Like most postmodern literature, the structure of this novel is discontinuous. Ellis maintains the aleatory disconnection by constantly changing the style of the novel; he shifts from dialogue to stream of consciousness to a third-person omniscient point of view. Ellis breaks the normal flow of extended prose not by default of this being a metafiction but because he writes the novel in an epistolary format. The novel is a bricolage of letters, menus, exams, songs and other documents.

=== Themes ===
One theme of the novel is the question of how to represent blackness. This theme is portrayed in the novel through the conflict between Dewayne and Ishee. The two characters argue on how they think black people should be represented in their works. While Dewayne's style is postmodern and depicts atypical forms of blackness, Ishee's style is more traditional and characters are like those found in many works of African American literature. An example of this is found in a comparison of Earle's mother in Dewayne's version of the story vs. in Ishee's. The disparity in how the two authors choose to represent the black matriarch echoes the differences in style between different schools of black thinkers present in the time the book was written. Even in what they serve to their children, these two mothers depict the differences in representation that the two authors espouse. Through the conclusion reached between the two characters, Ellis seems to suggest that a synthesis of these two styles should be worked toward. It is only when Dewayne and Ishee reconcile their differences and give in to their feelings for one another that the conclusion of the story they are writing can be reached. Far from the postmodern beating out the traditional, or the experimental taking a back seat to the realist, the honest black experience of the time can only be told through a combination of the two approaches. In the narratives of Dewayne and Ishee several stereotypes of Black literature are explored, both common and unexpected. Here are a few:

- The Black geek, Earle in Dewayne's narrative. He is technologically skilled and has ambitions of an undergraduate education at Caltech or M.I.T..
- The Black masculine figure, Levon, Dorothy's athletic boyfriend in Dewayne's narrative. He is described as the "humongous black" football player "who looks like he could rip out a door" (140).
- The Jezebel figure, the portrayal of females as lascivious, promiscuous, and hypersexual. Dewayne's mother, Dorothy, and Julie and Isshee's Darcelle are portrayed as Jezebels.
- The mammy figure in Isshee's story, Earle's Black mother, "Sister Pride". She is a desexualized, self-sacrificing, religious, strong Black woman.
- The absent Black fathers appear in both Isshee's and Dewayne's stories, Earle and Dorothy are always fatherless.

The theme of representation is shown in the ways Earle chooses to align himself within the different communities of Uptown and Downtown. In Downtown Harlem, Earle is friends with other geeks and nerds and this nerdom, is a marker of whiteness. In Uptown Harlem, Earle aligns himself with Black Politics by assisting with the campaign of a Black politician.

== Additional work ==
He was also the subject of a half-hour documentary aired nationally on PBS, part of the series A Moveable Feast on South Carolina Educational Television/WETA-TV in 1991.
