= China Girl =

China Girl may refer to:

== Music ==
- "China Girl (1924 song)" a jazz song composed by Henry Halstead
- "China Girl" (song), a 1977 song by David Bowie and Iggy Pop, rerecorded and released as a single by Bowie in 1983
- "China Girl", a song by John Cougar, released in 1982 on the album American Fool
- "China Girl", a song by the group The 411 from their album Between the Sheets
- "China Girl", a single by Afric Simone
- China Girl: The Classical Album 2, a 1997 album by Vanessa-Mae

== Other uses ==
- China girl (filmmaking), an image appearing in reel leaders to assist with color calibration
- China Girl (1942 film), starring Gene Tierney and George Montgomery
- China Girl (1987 film), a 1987 film directed by Abel Ferrara
- China Girl (manga), a manga serialised in Big Comic
- Top of the Lake: China Girl, the second season of the Australian-New Zealand series Top of the Lake
