= China Girl (1924 song) =

Single
- Released: 1924
- Genre: Popular

"China Girl" is a popular song by Henry Halstead, Don Warner, and Louis C. Singer, published in 1924. The song is about a male American Chinese immigrant in a Chinatown writing to his love back in China.

"China Girl" by Jimmie Joy's St. Anthony Hotel Orchestra, 1925

== Background ==
This song was written, though, during the 61 year period where people from China were banned from immigrating to the U.S. It was also written just after the Immigration Act of 1924, preventing all Asian immigration.

== Composition ==
The lyrics, cover, and composition of this song rely heavily on aspects of Orientalism, and stereotyping. The song uses the Pentatonic scale and the perfect fourth harmony, which are generally associated with Chinese & Asian music.

The cover, illustrated by Porter Griffith, depicts stereotypes about the facial features of Chinese people, along with Hindu swastikas, tea, pottery, stereotypical clothing, and lanterns, which are all also used as stereotypes of the Chinese people and culture.

== Lyrics ==
The lyrics, according to its piano roll recording:

Verse 1

Down in China Town there lived a China boy,
thinking of his China Girl so far away,
Writing letters to her was his only joy,
This is what he would say:

Chorus

"China girl, I hear you calling China pearl
Autumn leaves are falling.
I am sad, and lonely too, I wish I had you near me.
My heart yearns for my lotus flower incense burns for you ev'ry hour.
In my shrine, I worship you:
Like a dreamer building castles in the air,
I have visions, soon I'll be returning there.
When blossoms blooms, and the birds are singing just us two,
Happiness they're bringing wait for me, little China girl."

Chorus

"China girl, I hear you calling China pearl
Autumn leaves are falling.
I am sad, and lonely too, I wish I had you near me.
My heart yearns for my lotus flower incense burns for you ev'ry hour.
In my shrine, I worship you:
Like a dreamer building castles in the air,
I have visions, soon I'll be returning there.
When blossoms blooms, and the birds are singing just us two,
Happiness they're bringing wait for me, little China girl."

Verse 2

Winter's chilly days are over, spring is near.
Very soon this China boy will sail away
To his little China girl so very dear,
In his dreams, he would say:

Chorus

"China girl, I hear you calling China pearl
Autumn leaves are falling.
I am sad, and lonely too, I wish I had you near me,
My heart yearns for my lotus flower incense burns for you ev'ry hour.
In my shrine, I worship you:
Like a dreamer building castles in the air,
I have visions, soon I'll be returning there.
When blossoms blooms, and the birds are singing just us two,
Happiness they're bringing wait for me, little China girl."

== Recordings ==
- Sometime in 1924, pianist Harold Scott recorded a piano roll version.
- On September 12, 1924, one of the songs authors, Henry Halstead, and his orchestra, released a version on Victor record PB-54.
- On February 25, 1925, the Clover Garden Orchestra released a version on Columbia record 140393.
- On January 29, 1925, the Golden Pheasant Orchestra released a version on Brunswick record 299W-301W.
- In May 1925, the St. Anthony Hotel Orchestra with Jimmy Joy, released a version on OKeh record 9111.
- On February 11, 1930, the Casa Loma Orchestra released a version on OKeh record W403755.
