= King's Jesters =

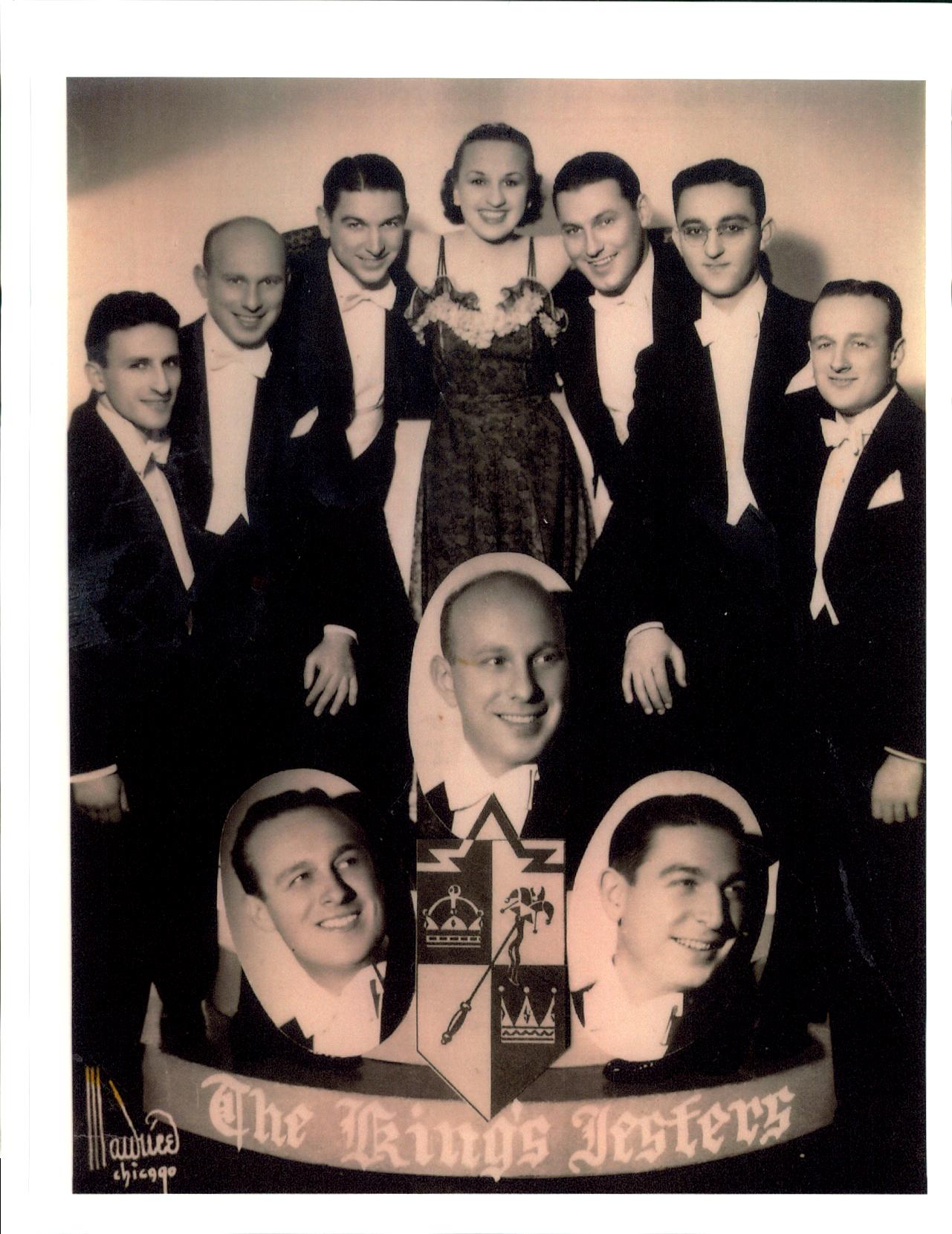
The King's Jesters pictured with Marjorie Whitney

The King's Jesters began as a comic vocal trio that also played instruments along with an accompanist. It comprised John Ravencroft - sax and clarinet, Francis "Fritz" Bastow - banjo and guitar, George Howard - drums and vibraphone, along with Ray McDermott - piano, accordion, and arranger. They were hired by Paul Whiteman to replace The Rhythm Boys and sang with him from 1930 to 1931. When they left Whiteman, they added vocalist Marjorie Whitney (whom they called their queen). These five were the core of the King's Jesters. The group most often appeared on Billboard's Music Popularity Charts in the '40s.

== Discovery ==
Ray McDermott became interested in the boys and their story - in their ambition to strike the big time with their singing and vocal orchestra ideas. He listened to them. Became more interested. Trained them, gave them hope, encouragement, ideas. "And when he hit Cincinnati with Whiteman, he waited for his opportunity to arrange for an audition for the boys. The time came - and up came the boys suitcases in their hands and hearts in their mouths. "Mac" was reclassified as a member of the "King's Jesters" as Whiteman named them.

== A new band ==
In 1932 the King's Jesters left Whiteman, who replaced them with The Nitecaps trio (later known as The Rhythm Boys). They formed a new band with Fritz Bastow, George Howard and John Ravencroft, members of a six-piece orchestra which was formed in Chicago and Rochester. The King's Jesters is now composed of seven members which include: the three Rochester men, Ray McDermott who has been the piano accompanist for the Jesters, Jimmy Awad on trumpet, Bob Casey on string bass, and a girl blues singer, Marjorie Whitney. The King's Jesters broadcast daily from the Hotel Morrison in Chicago and are heard over the NBC network. In June 1936 the King's Jesters begin playing at the Bismark Hotel in Chicago, IL. Their repertoire has numerous instrumental combinations for fox trot dancing and equally attractive vocal combinations for the bright, straight, and novelty tunes they perform.

== America's Biggest Little Band ==
After Ray McDermott died of pneumonia in 1937, The King's Jesters and their band opened a new floor show in the Blue Fountain Room at the La Salle Hotel current site for the State of Illinois Building Thompson Center, 2013 in Chicago. In July 1937, The King's Jesters orchestra received much publicity when their band's picture was used on the front cover of the July 3, 1937 issue of the Billboard, one of America's foremost amusement weeklies. The King's Jesters are recognized as "America's Biggest Little Band." They were under the management of Consolidated Radio Artists, Inc. of Chicago at that time.

In 1937 the King's Jesters performed at the Fairview Hotel & Dance Gardens after completing a several month engagement in the LaSalle Hotel, Chicago.

== Press coverage ==
- It is difficult to tell where one of the King's Jesters shows begins and where it leaves off.
- These indefatigable musicians seem to be on the floor every minute; they sing and play more songs in the course of an evening than other headliners would in a month of Saturdays.
- "Numbers in the show that were new to us - and hope to you - are 'Turkish Delight','The Deacon Steps Out', sung with the 'Peck-in' dance introduced in 'New Faces of 1937' and 'Today I am a Man'. Their queen, Marjorie Whitney, has a number of songs to herself, which include 'They Can't Take That Away From Me' and 'There'll be Changes Made'.

== Benny Goodman ==
The King's Jesters band made two guest appearances with Benny Goodman and his orchestra, one on July 7, 1941, and one on July 24, 1941. They appeared at such places as the Sir Francis Drake hotel in San Francisco; William Penn hotel in Pittsburgh; LaSalle hotel in Chicago; the Carlton hotel in Washington, and the Philadelphia hotel in Philadelphia. For all these spots they broadcast over the NBC and Mutual coast-to-coast networks.

== The end ==
Although Ray McDermott died in 1937, the band grew at one point to 10 members. All the members retired in 1962. The original vocal trio was from Rochester, Indiana and that is where they died. George Howard died in 1991, Francis Bastow died in 1992 and John Ravencroft died in 1996. Marjorie Whitney was from Lincoln NE and died in 1994 in Las Vegas, NV, under the name Marjorie Halter. Marjorie Whitney was married to Big Band orchestra leader Henry Halstead.
