= Paper lantern =

East Asian style of lantern made of thin, brightly colored paper

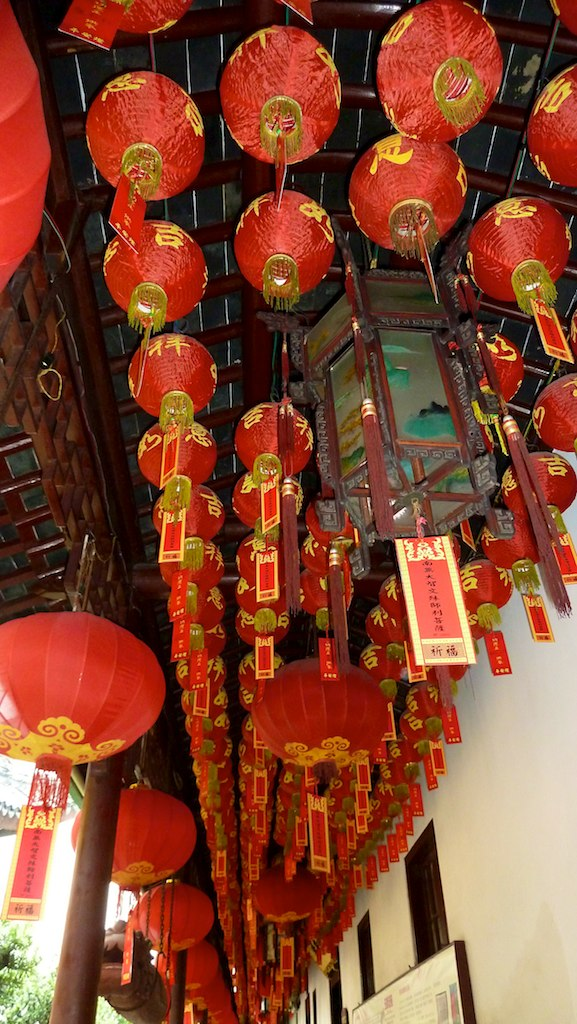
Red paper lanterns for sale in Shanghai, 2012

A paper lantern is a lantern made of thin, brightly colored paper. Paper lanterns come in various shapes and sizes, as well as various methods of construction. In their simplest form, they are simply a paper bag with a candle placed inside, although more complicated lanterns consist of a collapsible bamboo or metal frame of hoops covered with tough paper.

== Origin ==
Paper lanterns are likely derived from earlier lanterns that used other types of translucent material like silk, horn, or animal skin. The material covering was used to prevent the flame in the lantern from being extinguished by wind, while still retaining its use as a light source. Papermaking technology originated from China from at least AD 105 during the Eastern Han dynasty, but it is unknown exactly when paper became used for lanterns. Poems about paper lanterns start to appear in Chinese history at around the 6th century. Paper lanterns were common by the Tang dynasty (AD 690–705), and it was during this period that the first annual lantern festival was established. From China, it was spread to neighboring cultures in East Asia, Southeast Asia, and South Asia.

== Types ==
There are three general types of paper lanterns, they are:

- Hanging lantern – the basic type of paper lantern used for illumination. They are meant to be carried, hung, or mounted on stands.
- Sky lantern – a small hot air balloon made of paper, with an opening at the bottom where a small fire is suspended. Also known as "flying lanterns", "sky candles" or "fire balloons."
- Water lantern – paper lanterns that float on the surface of water.

== By region ==
In addition to everyday usage as a light source in the past, paper lanterns are commonly associated with festivals in East Asian, Southeast Asian, and South Asian cultures.

=== East Asia ===
==== China & Taiwan ====
Paper lanterns are called Dēnglóng (simplified Chinese: 灯笼; traditional Chinese: 燈籠) in China.

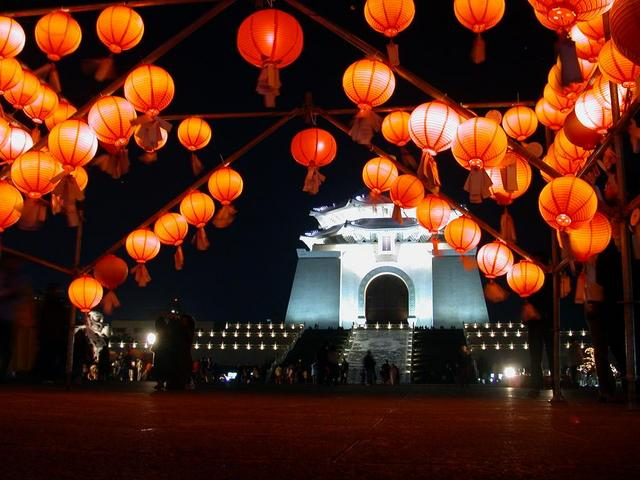
Lantern festival at the Chiang Kai-shek Memorial Hall in Taiwan

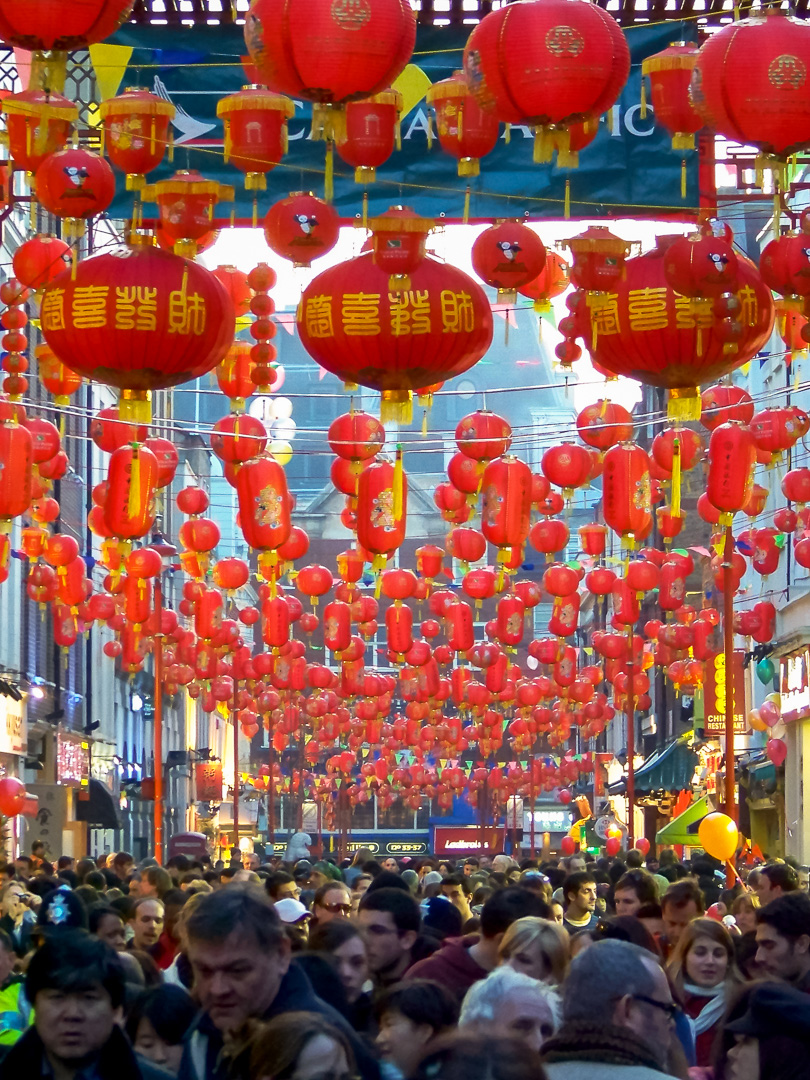
Lanterns above the street in London's Chinatown

==== Japan and Korea ====
In Japan the traditional styles include bonbori and chōchin and there is a special style of lettering called chōchin moji used to write on them.

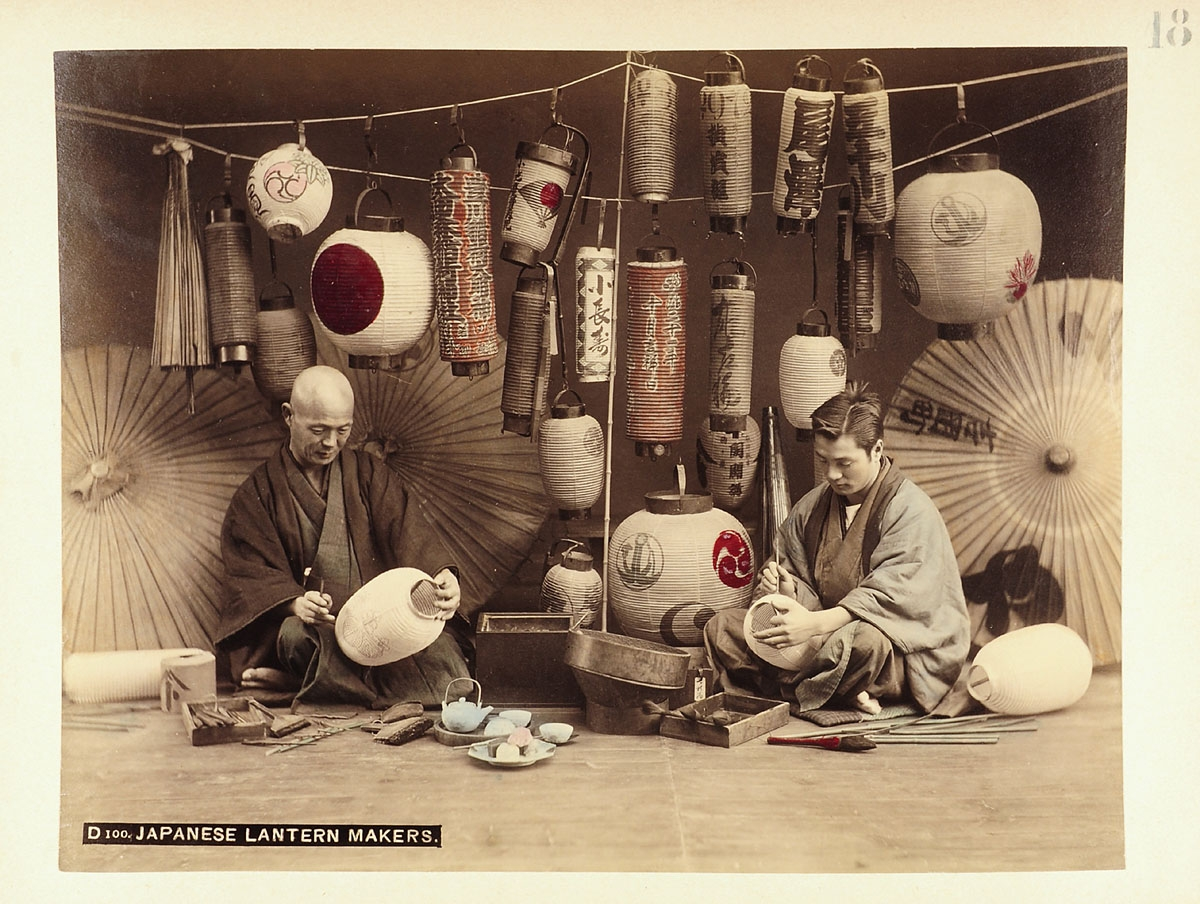
Japanese Lantern Makers, photo by T. Enami

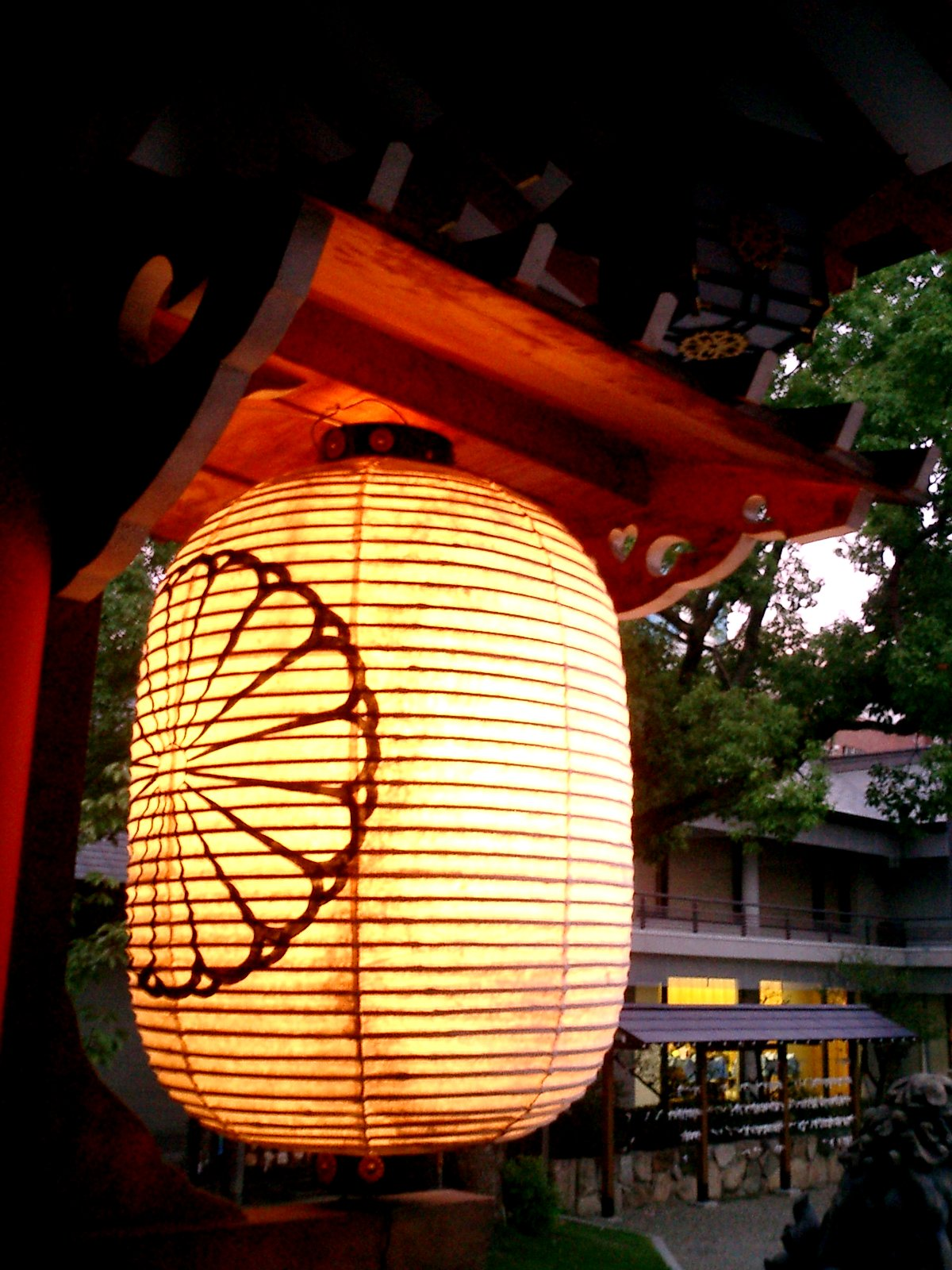
A chochin lantern from Japan

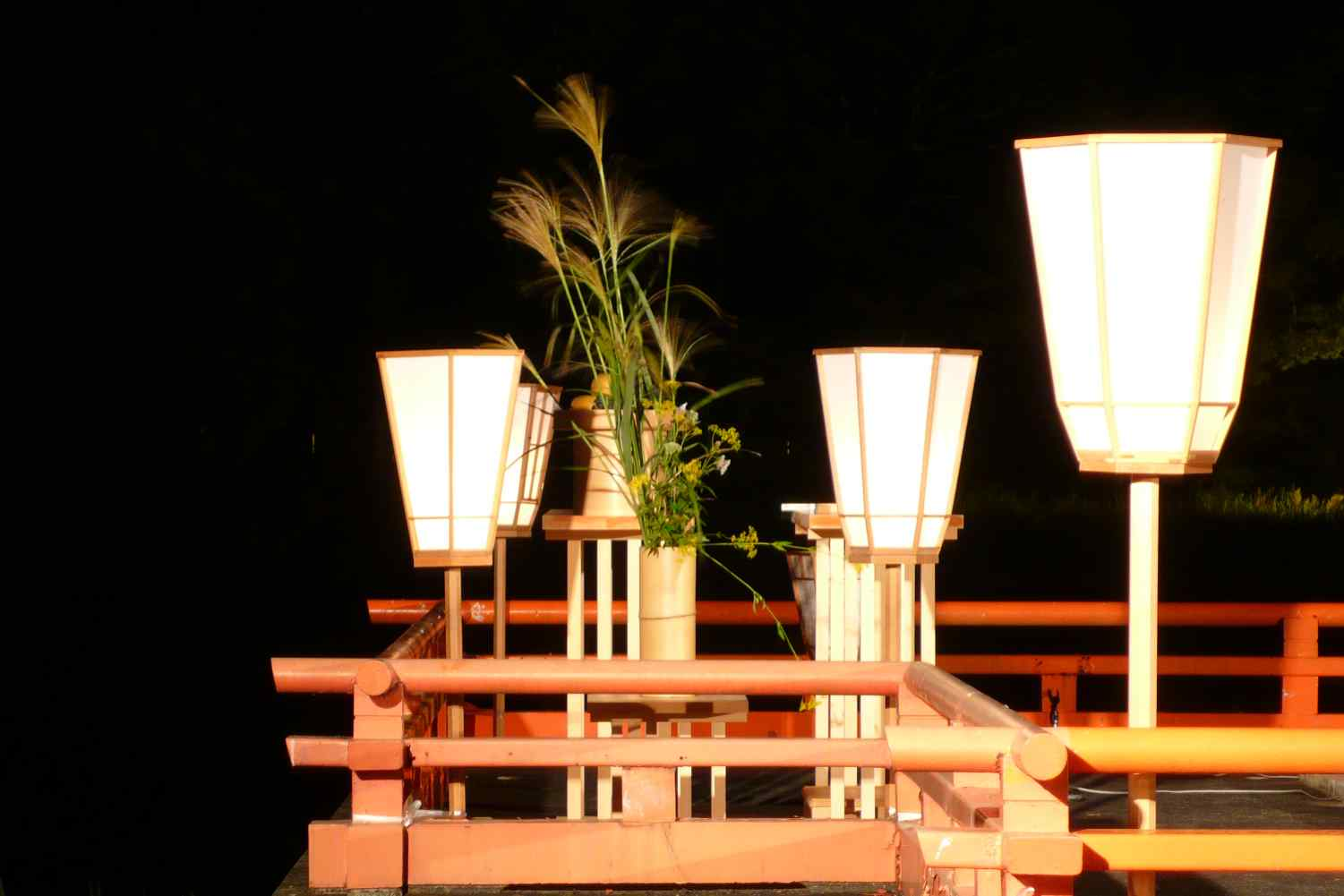
Hexagonal bonbori lamps at the Ise Grand Shrine

Paper lanterns in the collection of the National Folk Museum of Korea

=== Southeast Asia ===
==== Philippines ====
In the Philippines, a traditional paper lantern is the parol, which is regarded an iconic symbol of Filipino Christmas. Traditionally constructed using bamboo and Japanese paper, modern parols have been made using other materials such as plastic, metal, and capiz shells. Its most-common form is a five-pointed star, although it can come in various shapes and sizes.

Dating back to the Spanish colonial period of the Philippines, parols are a traditional part of the Panunulúyan pageant in the nine-day Christmas Novena procession leading up to the Simbang Gabi (midnight mass). It was initially rectangular or oblong in shape but eventually came to be made in various shapes. It became standardized to a five-pointed star (symbolizing the Star of Bethlehem) during the American colonial period.

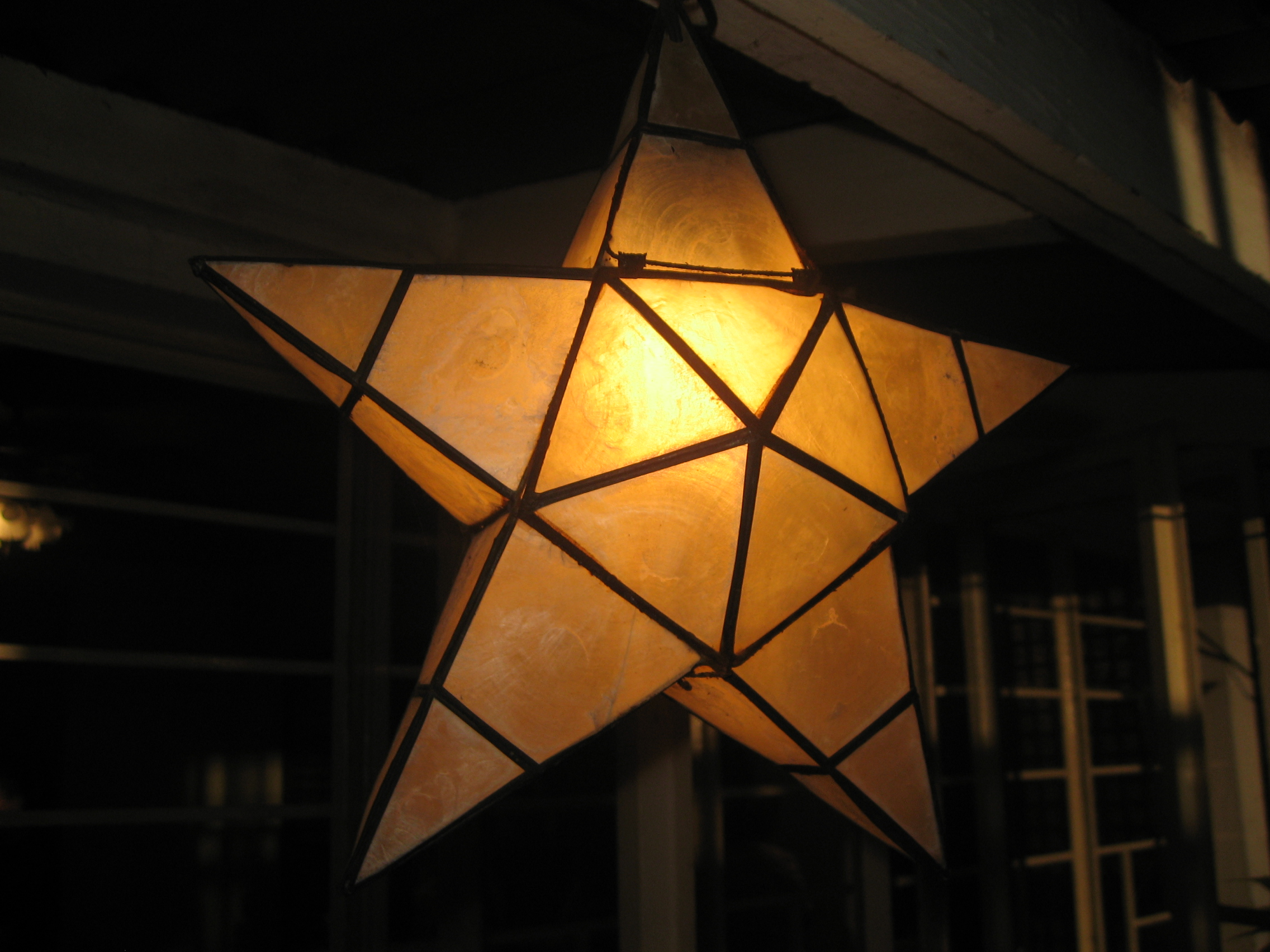
A simple star-shaped parol made of capiz shells

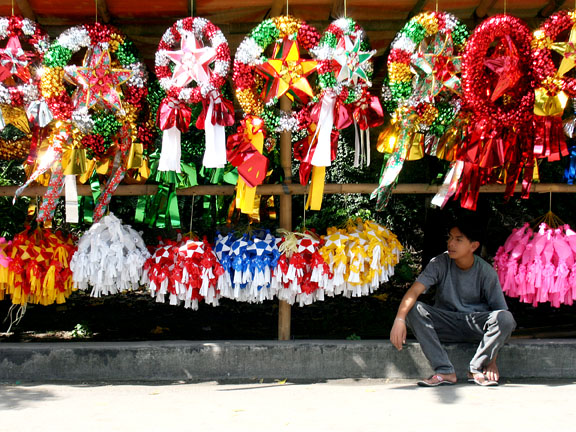
Parols for sale

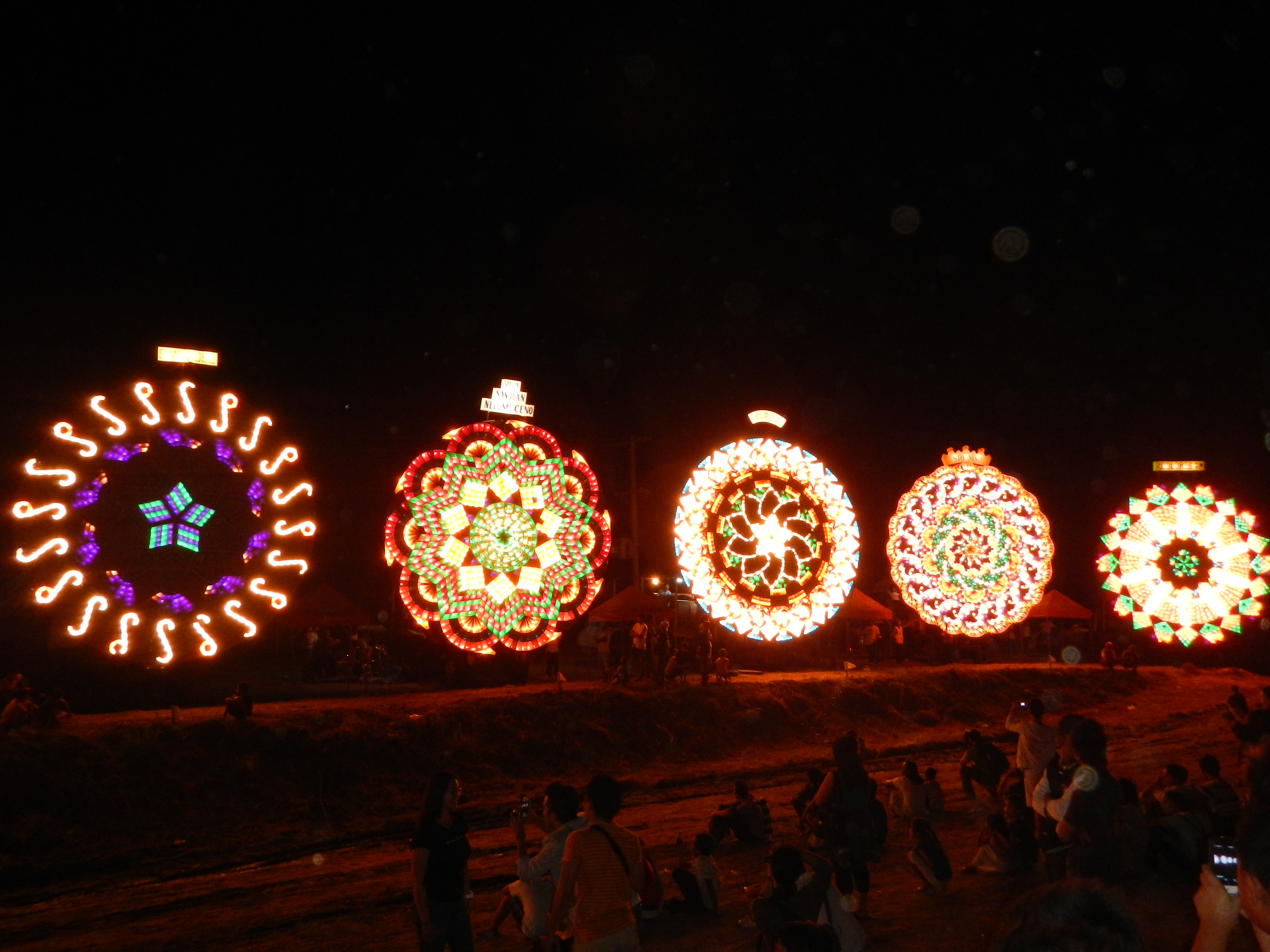
Programed electronic parols during the 2012 Giant Lantern Festival in San Fernando, Pampanga

==== Thailand ====
During the Yi Peng festival of Thailand, some people also decorate their houses, gardens, and temples with khom fai (Thai: โคมไฟ), intricately shaped paper lanterns which take on different forms. Khom thue (Thai: โคมถือ) are lanterns which are carried around hanging from a stick, khom khwaen (Thai: โคมแขวน) are the hanging lanterns, and khom pariwat (Thai: โคมปริวรรต), which are placed at temples and which revolve due to the heat of the candle inside. The most elaborate Yi Peng celebrations can be seen in Chiang Mai, the ancient capital of the former Lanna kingdom, where now both Loi Krathong and Yi Peng are celebrated at the same time resulting in lights floating on the waters, lights hanging from trees/buildings or standing on walls, and lights floating in the sky. The tradition of Yi Peng was also adopted by certain parts of Laos during the 16th century.

Thousands of sky lanterns called khom loi (Thai: โคมลอย) are also released annually during the Yi Peng festival. However, this is a relatively new addition to the festival, only dating back to the first decade of the 21st century as part of tourism development.

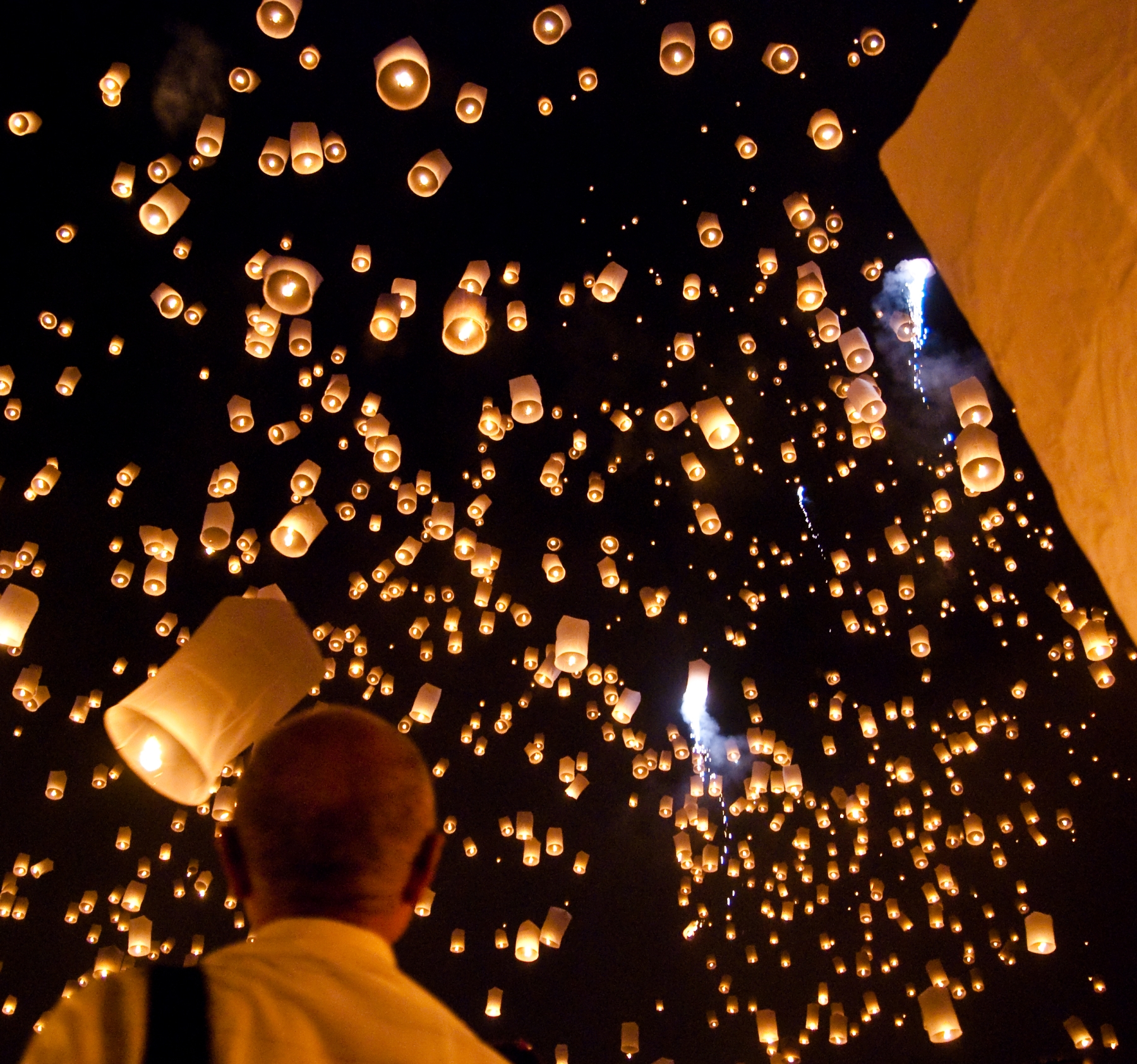
Sky lanterns in the sky on the night of Yi Peng in Thailand.

==== Vietnam ====
Two traditional festivals in Vietnam have prominent roles for lanterns:

1. Vu Lan on the 15th day of the seventh lunar month. Buddhist temples traditionally would host the release of floating water lanterns down river courses on small paper crafts with sticks of incense and written prayers.
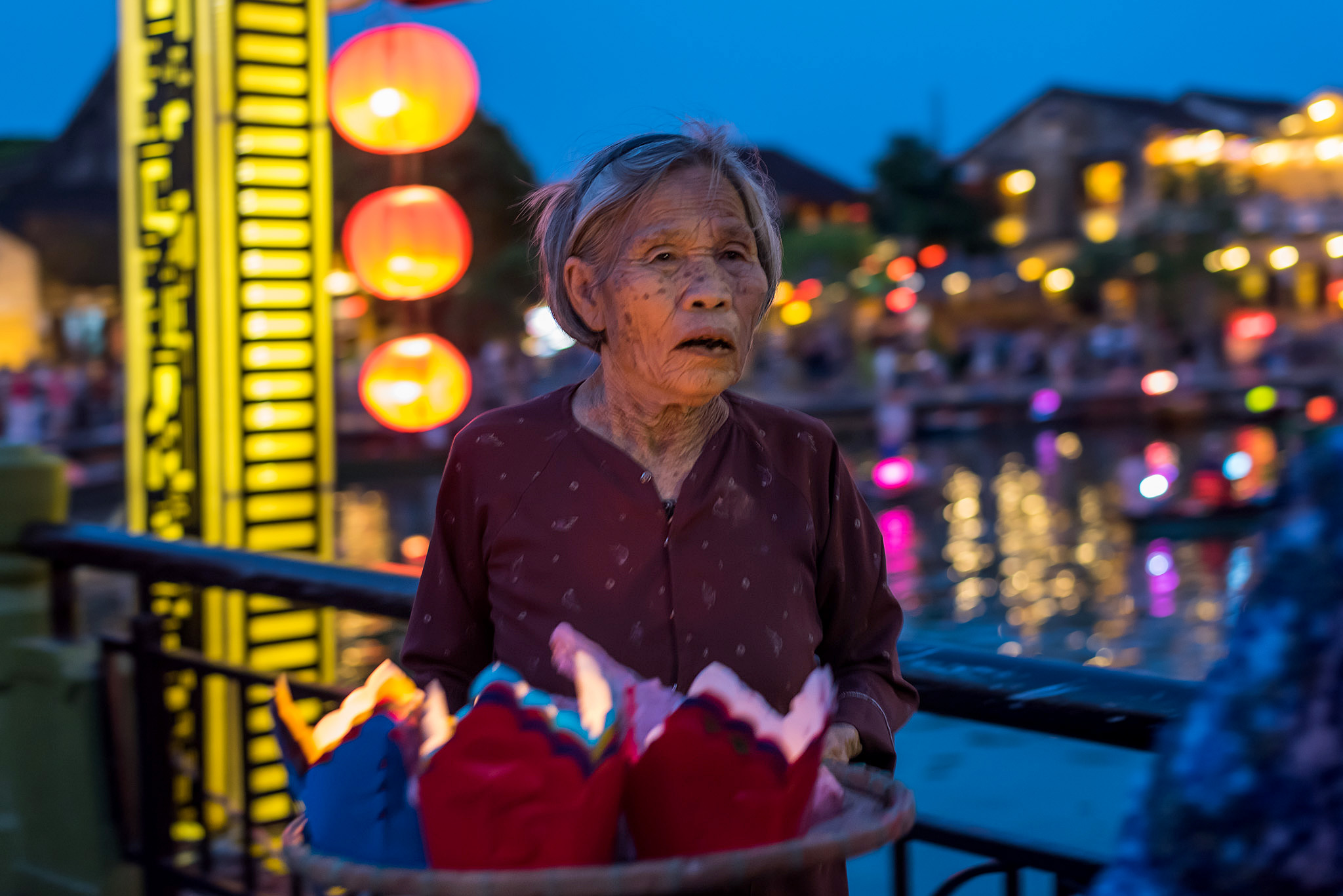
An old woman releases water lanterns in Hội An

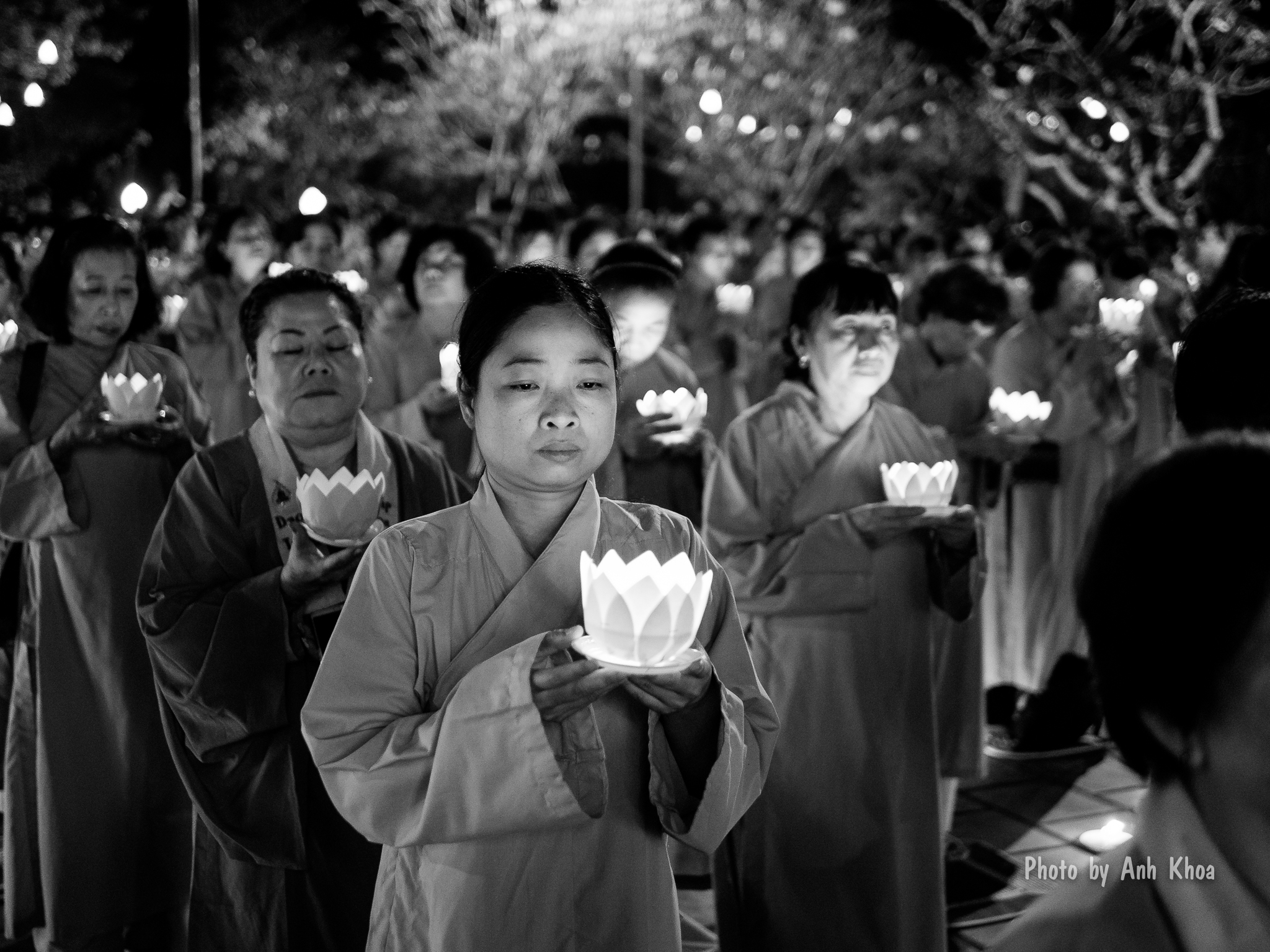
Buddhists and monks prepare to water lanterns on the occasion of Vu Lan
1. Tết Trung Thu, (Mid-Autumn festival) also known as the Children's Festival (Tết Nhi Đồng) on the 15th day of the eighth lunar month. Children would parade in the streets with lit lanterns (rước đèn) with accompanying music and songs after sunset. The lanterns in this case are whimsical with a multitude of shapes and themes like fish, star... The lanterns are typically in transparent colored papers.
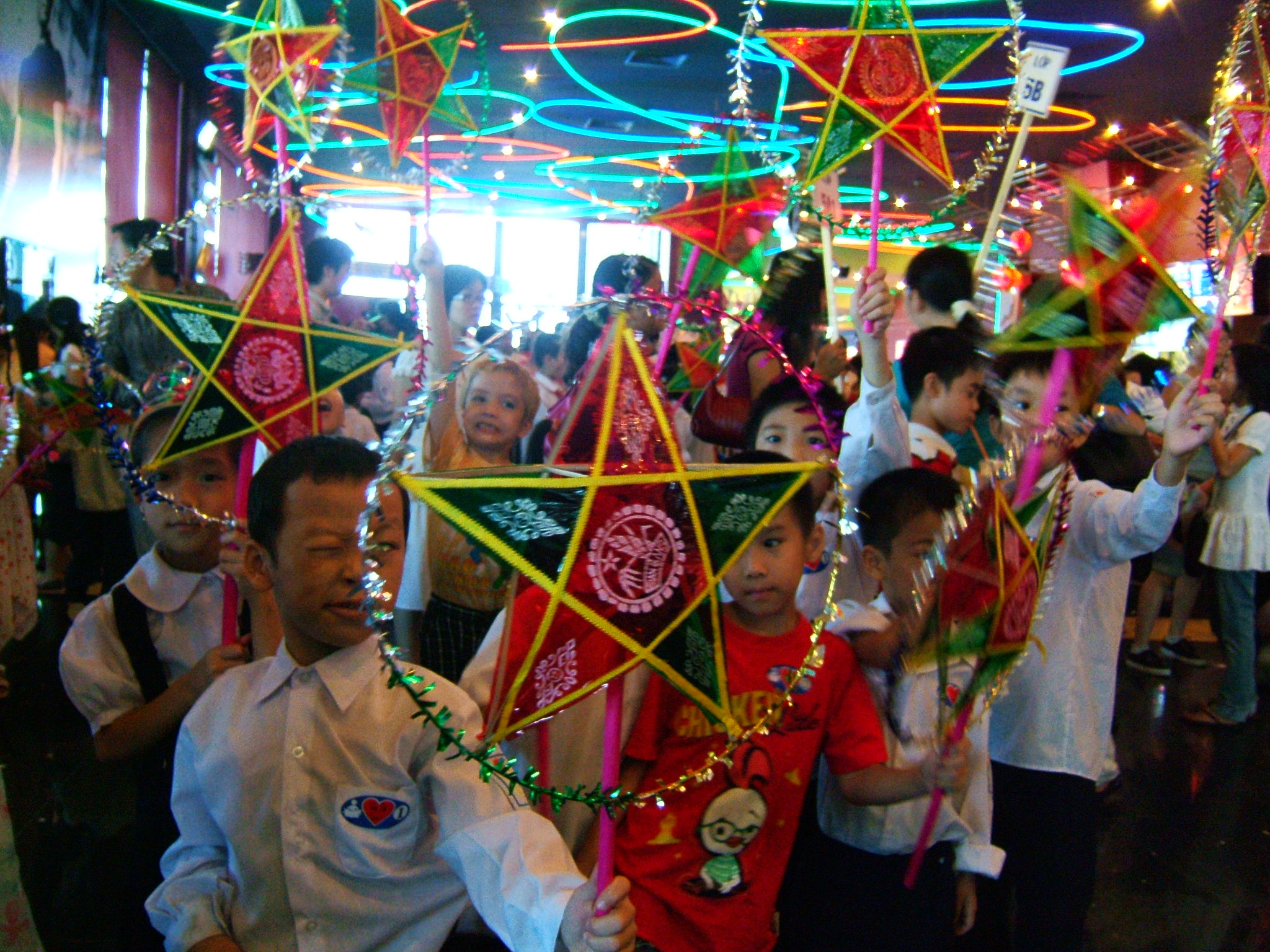
Star-shaped lanterns of tết Trung Thu.

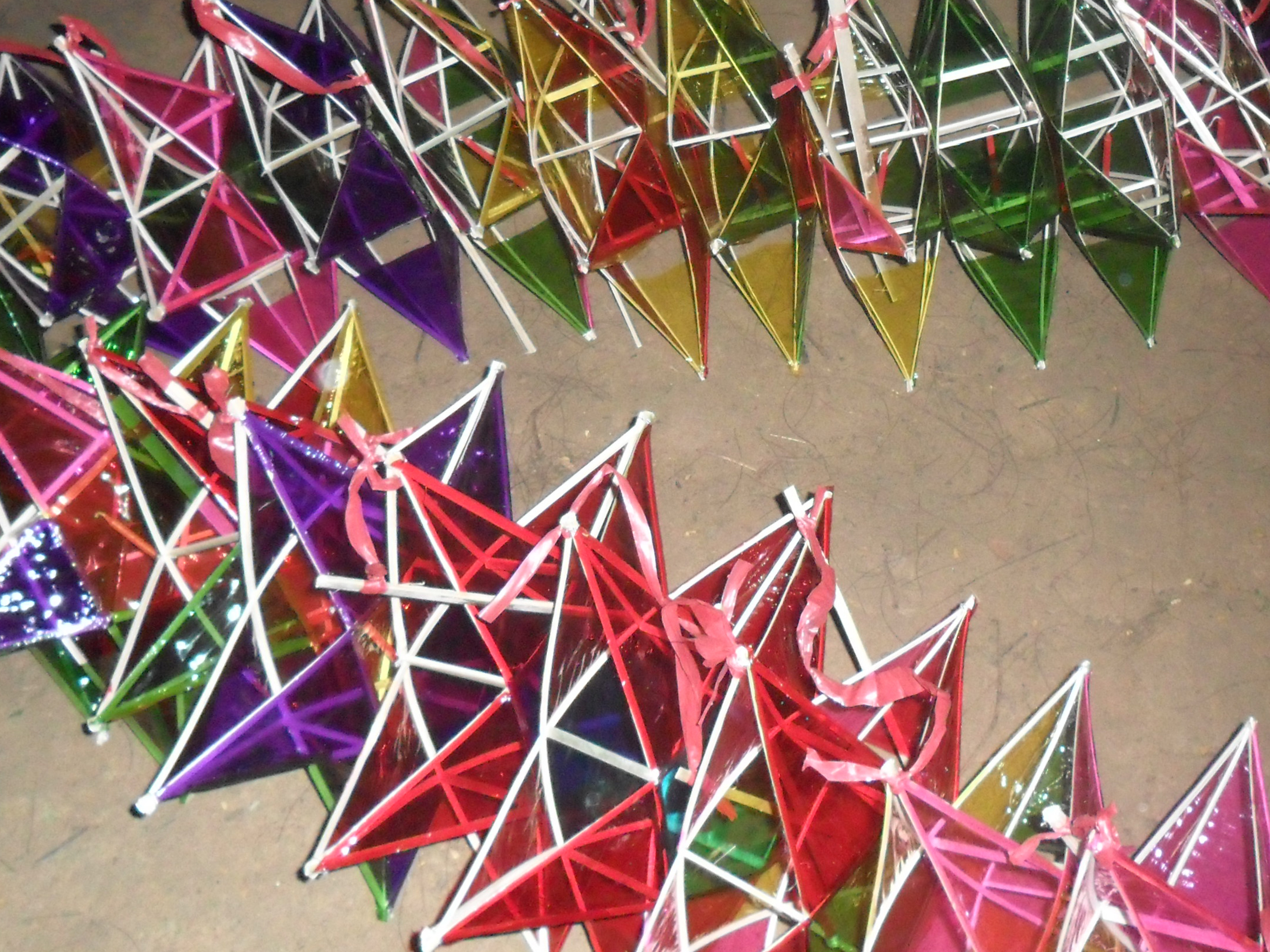
Star-shaped lanterns

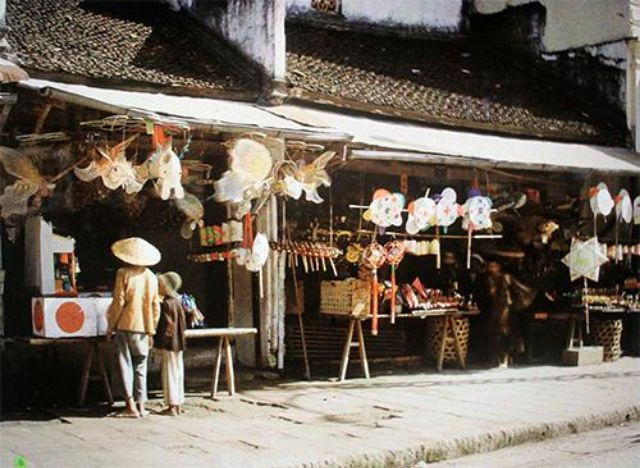
The street of colourful lanterns - Léon Busy (1874-1951)

In addition to the above two festivals, paper lanterns are also hung by Vietnamese people on the occasion of the Tết Nguyên Đán to look forward to a good new year.

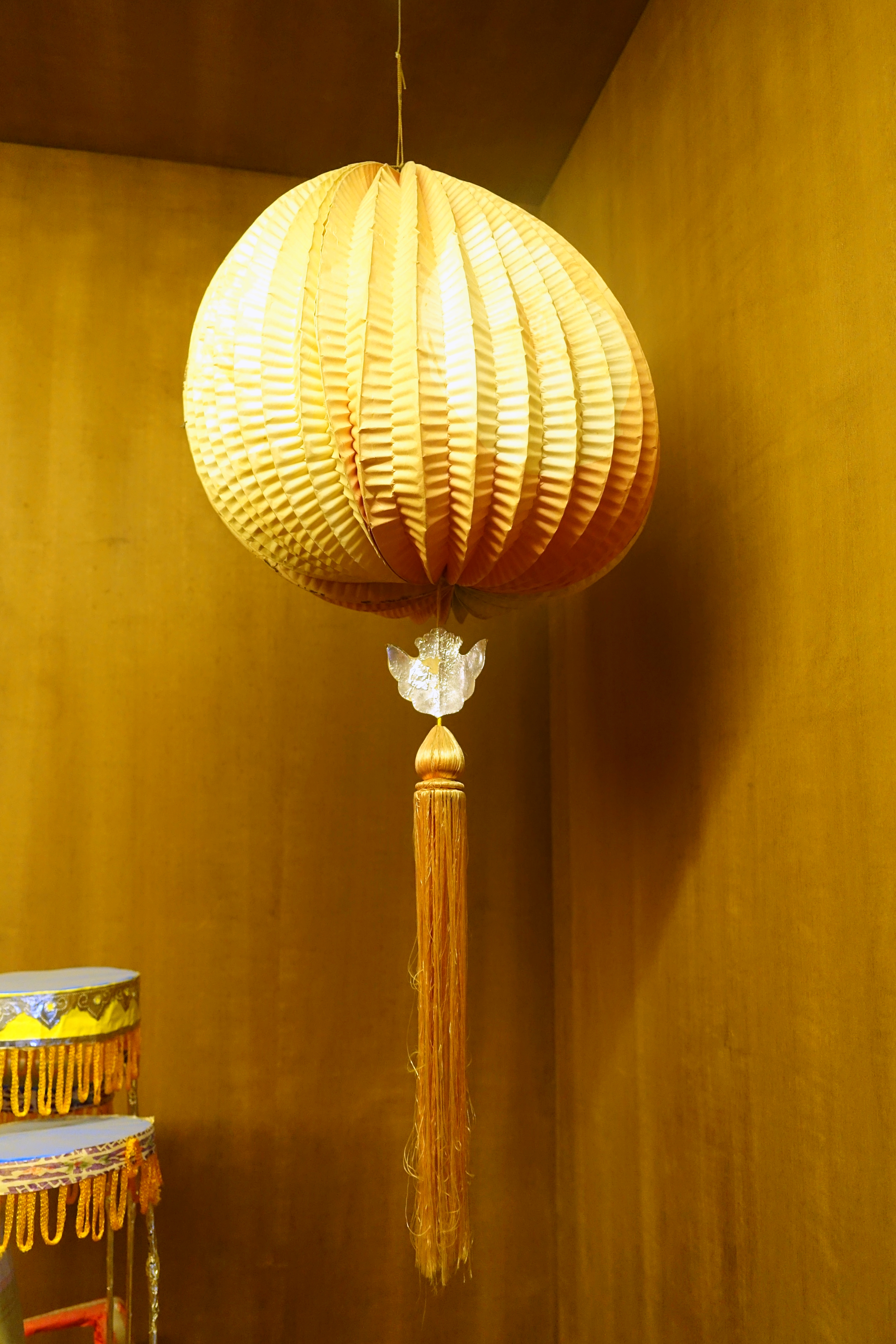
Paper lantern, Vietnam Museum of Ethnology - Hanoi

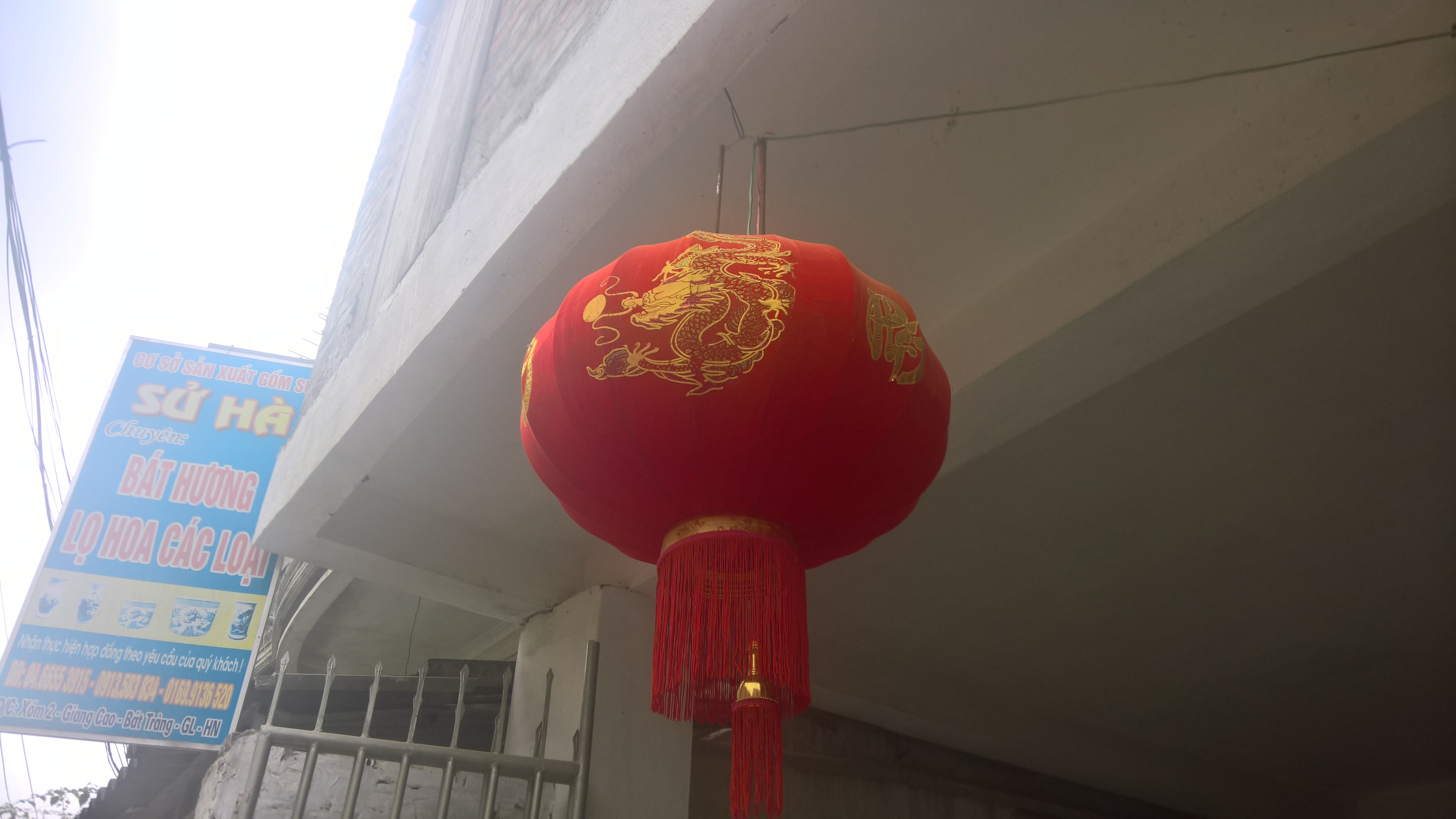
Paper lanterns are hung during the Tết Nguyên Đán in Bát Tràng village

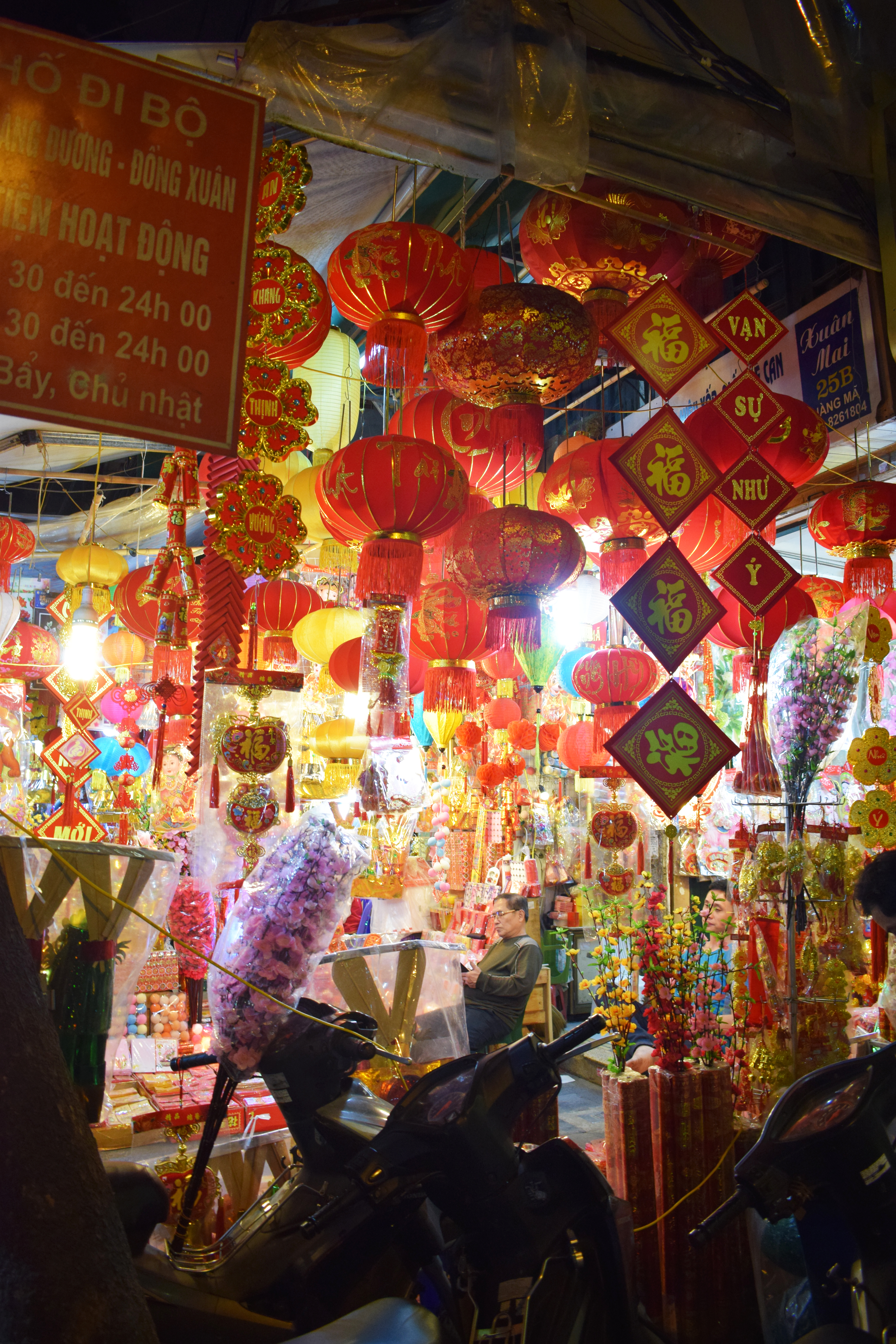
Paper lanterns in Hanoi's Old Quarter

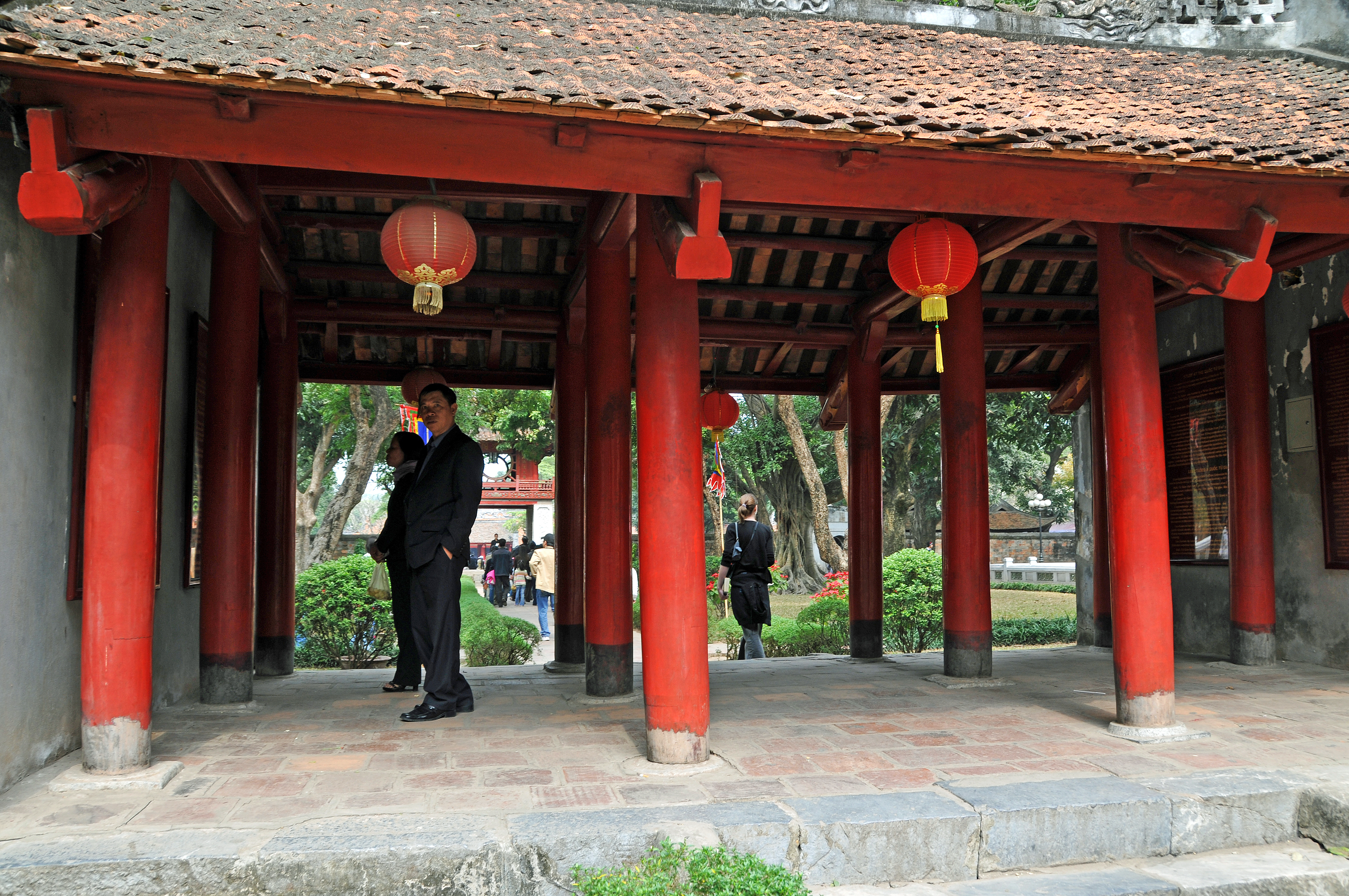
Đại Trung Gate, Văn Miếu

Paper lanterns are also used to attract visitors; for example, Hội An, a famous tourist destination of Vietnam, often hangs paper lanterns throughout the year to attract tourists.

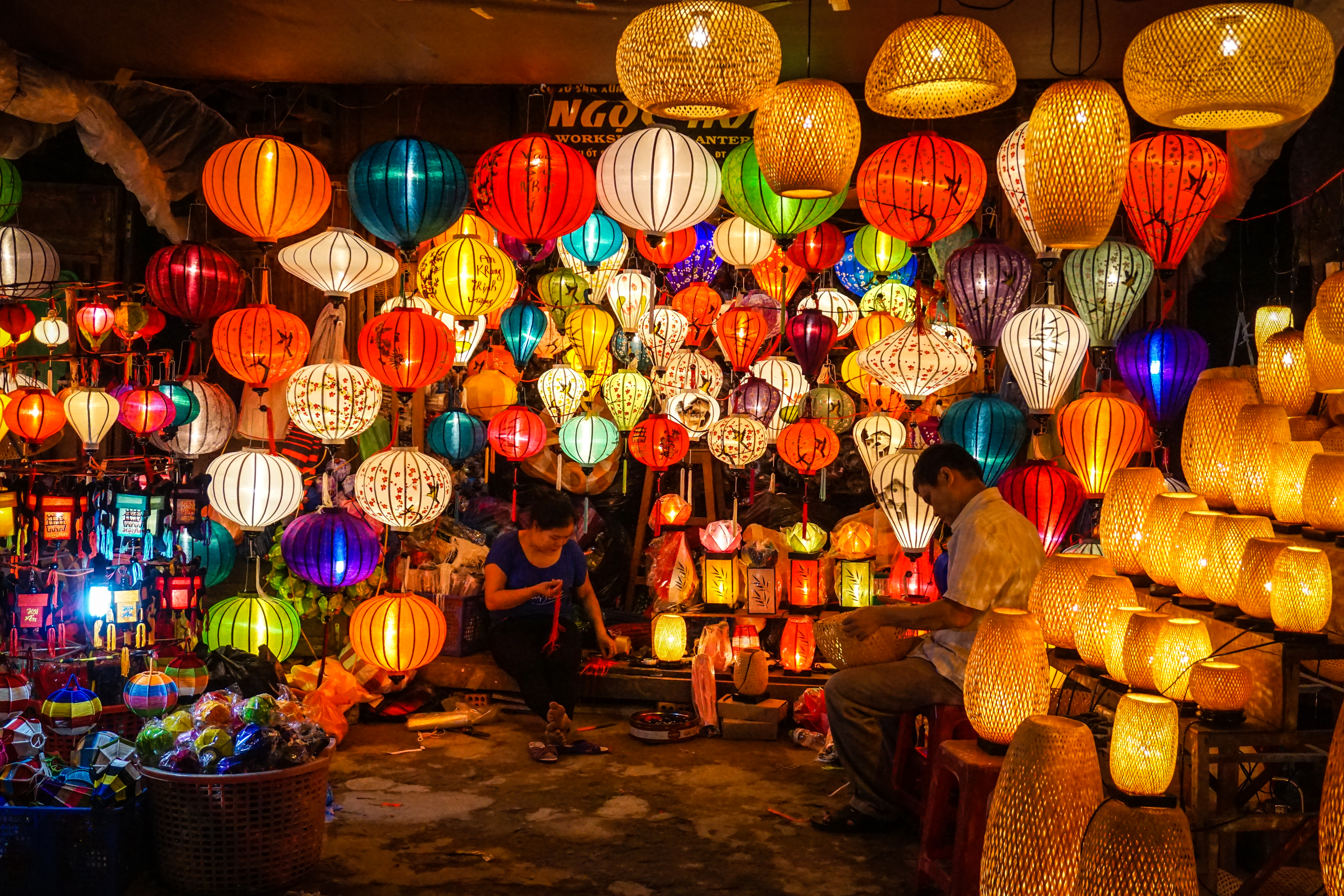

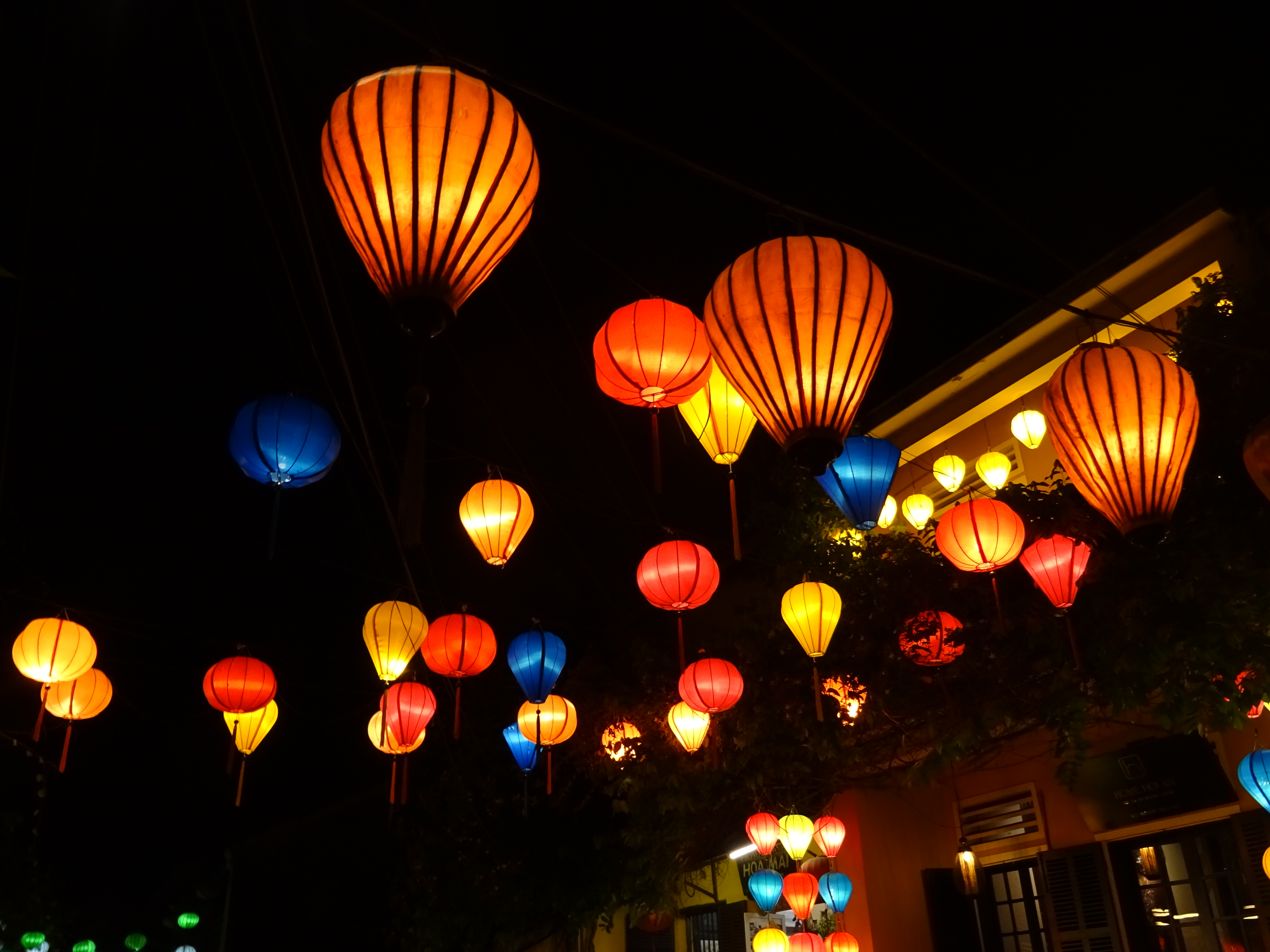

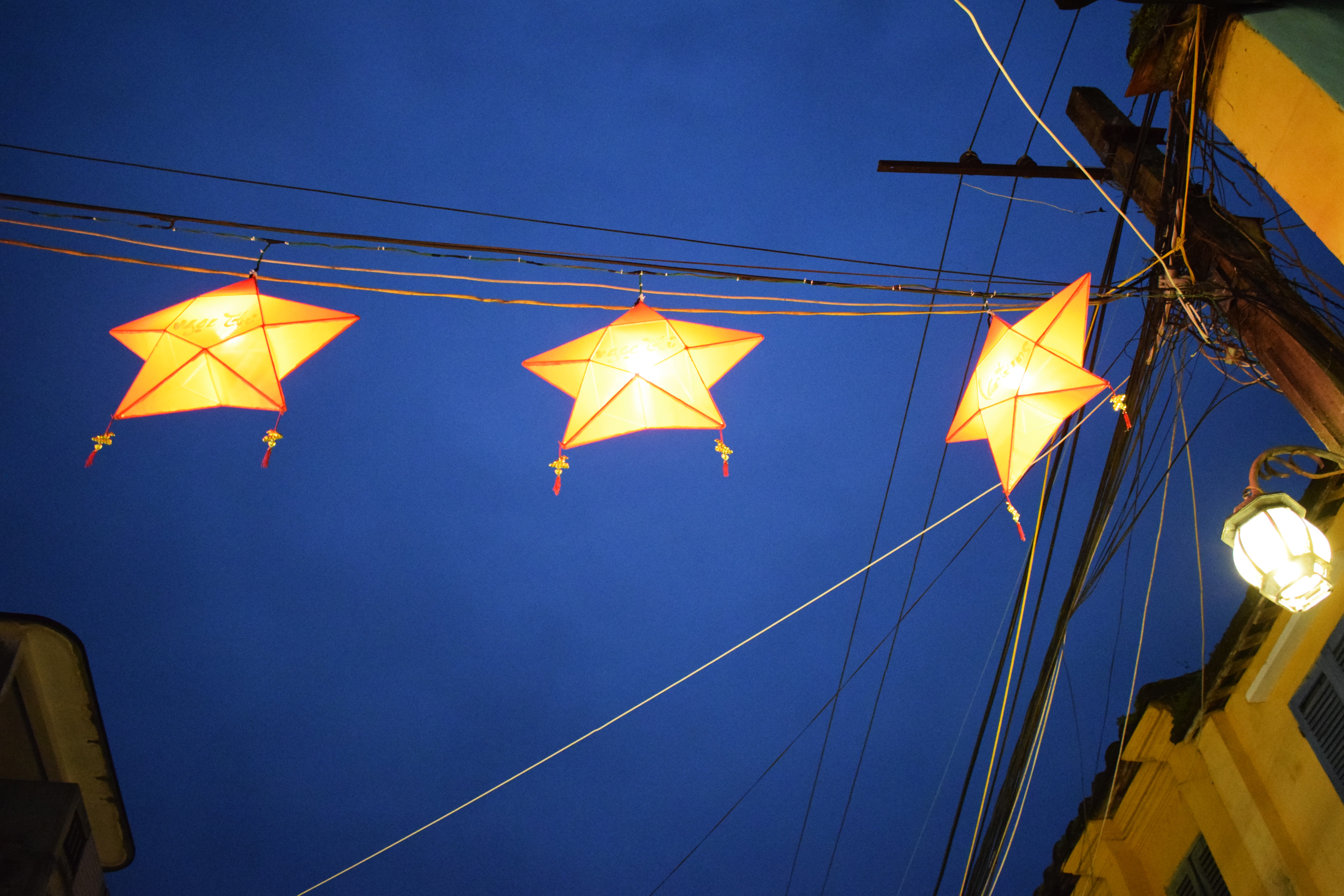

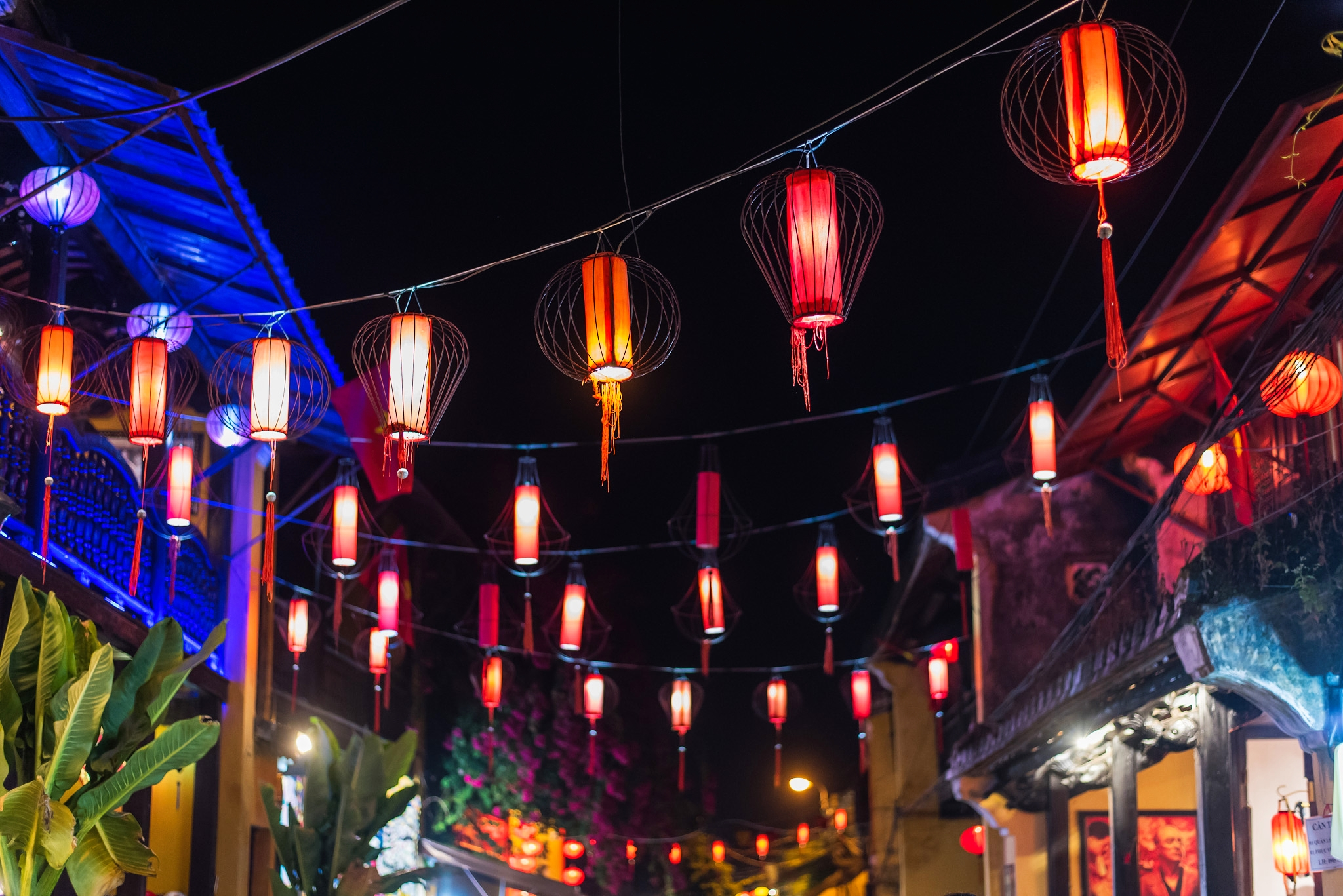
Paper Lanterns in the streets of Hội An

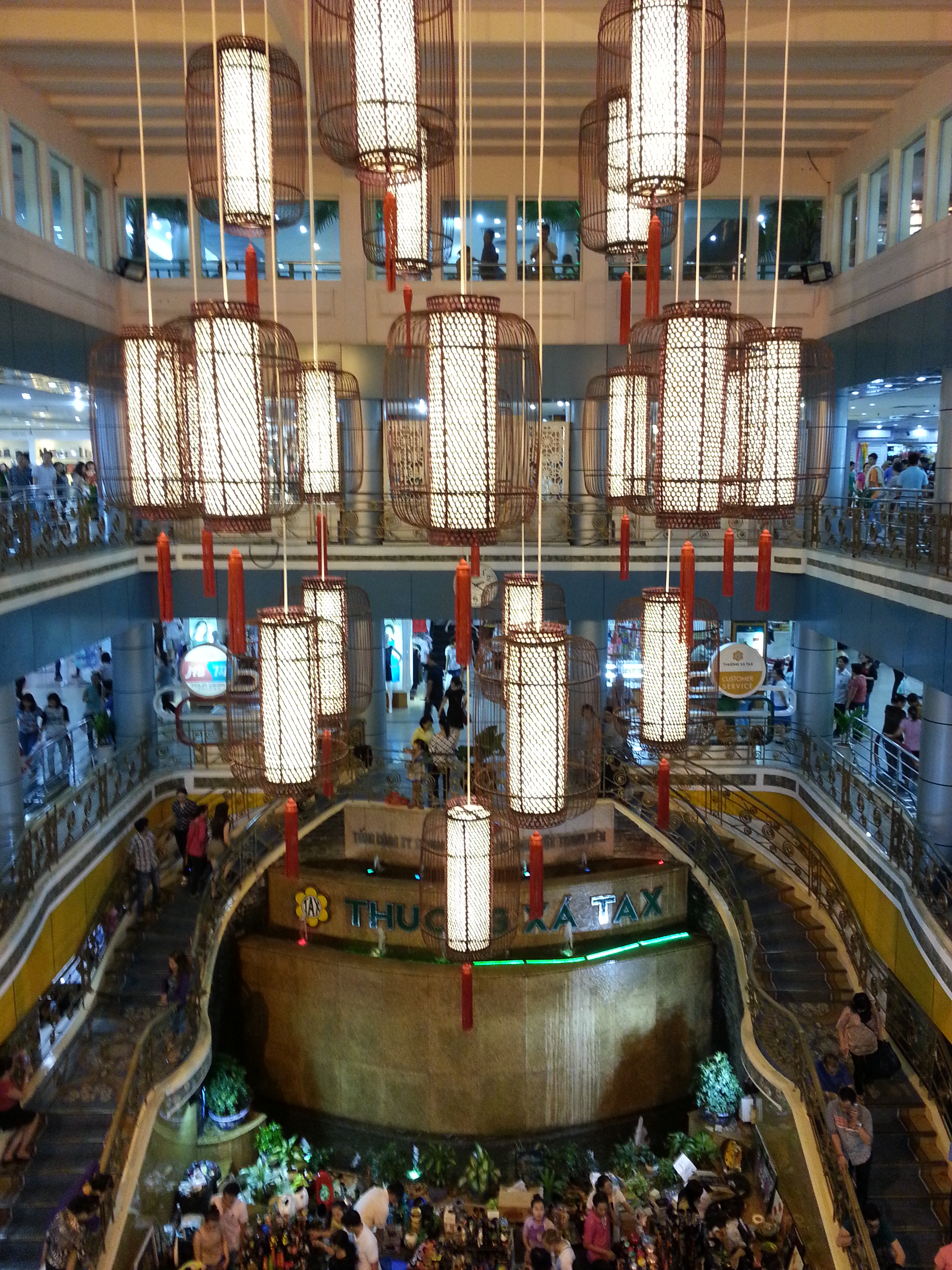
Paper Lanterns in Thương xá Tax

==== Malaysia & Singapore ====
Paper lanterns are used especially in Chinatown areas in countries having notable Chinese ethnicity heritage.

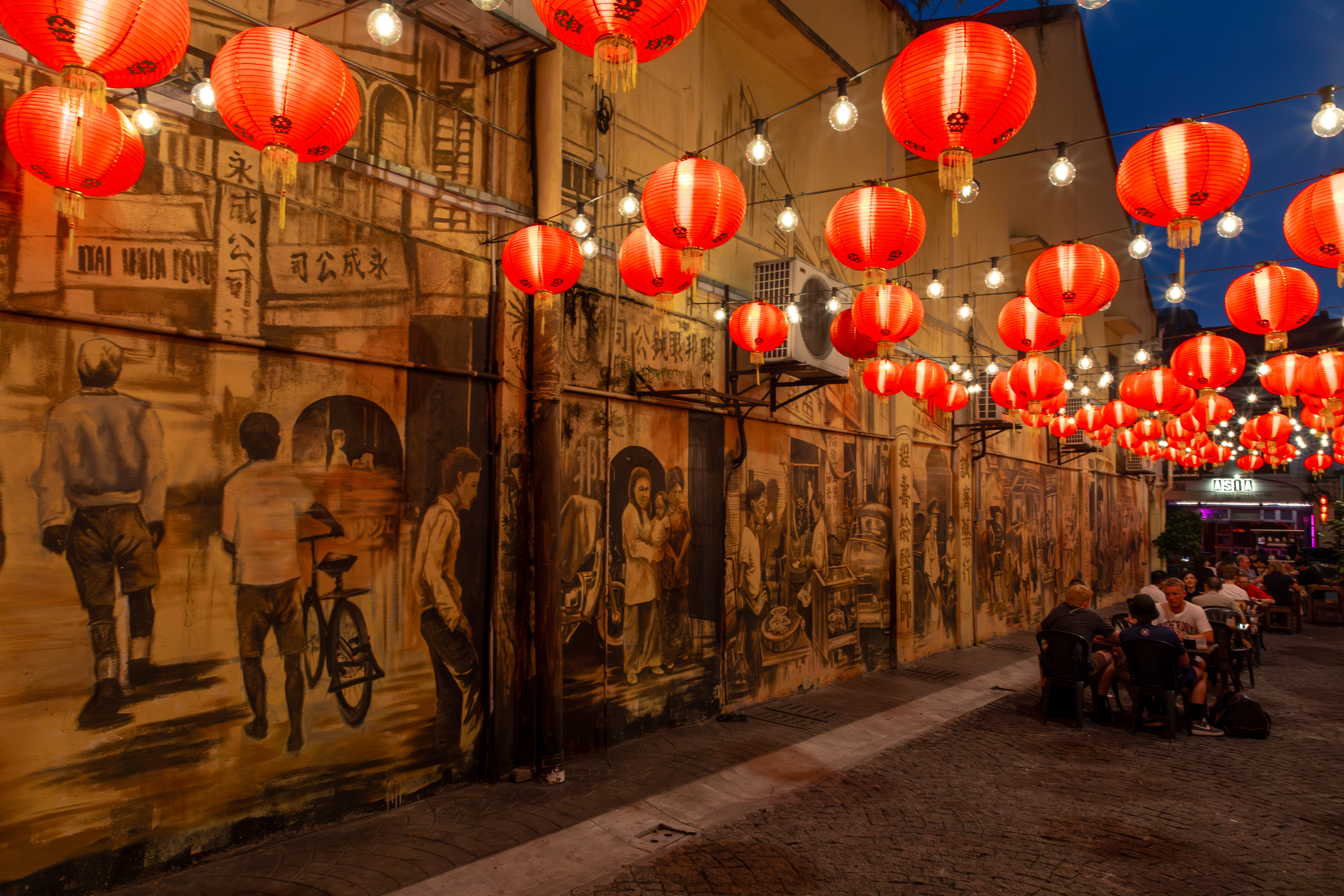
Lanterns in Chinatown, Kuala Lumpur

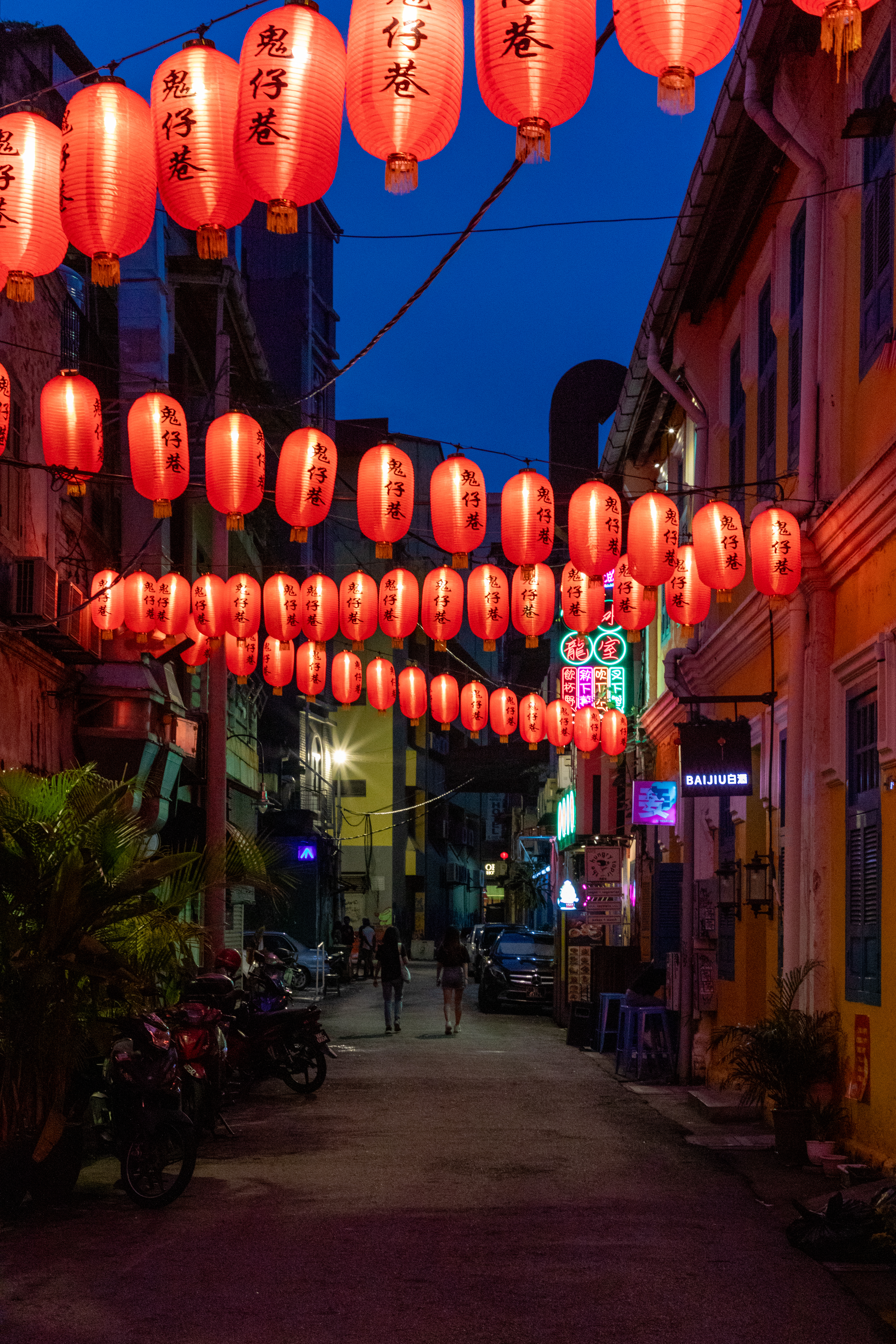
Lanterns in Chinatown, Kuala Lumpur

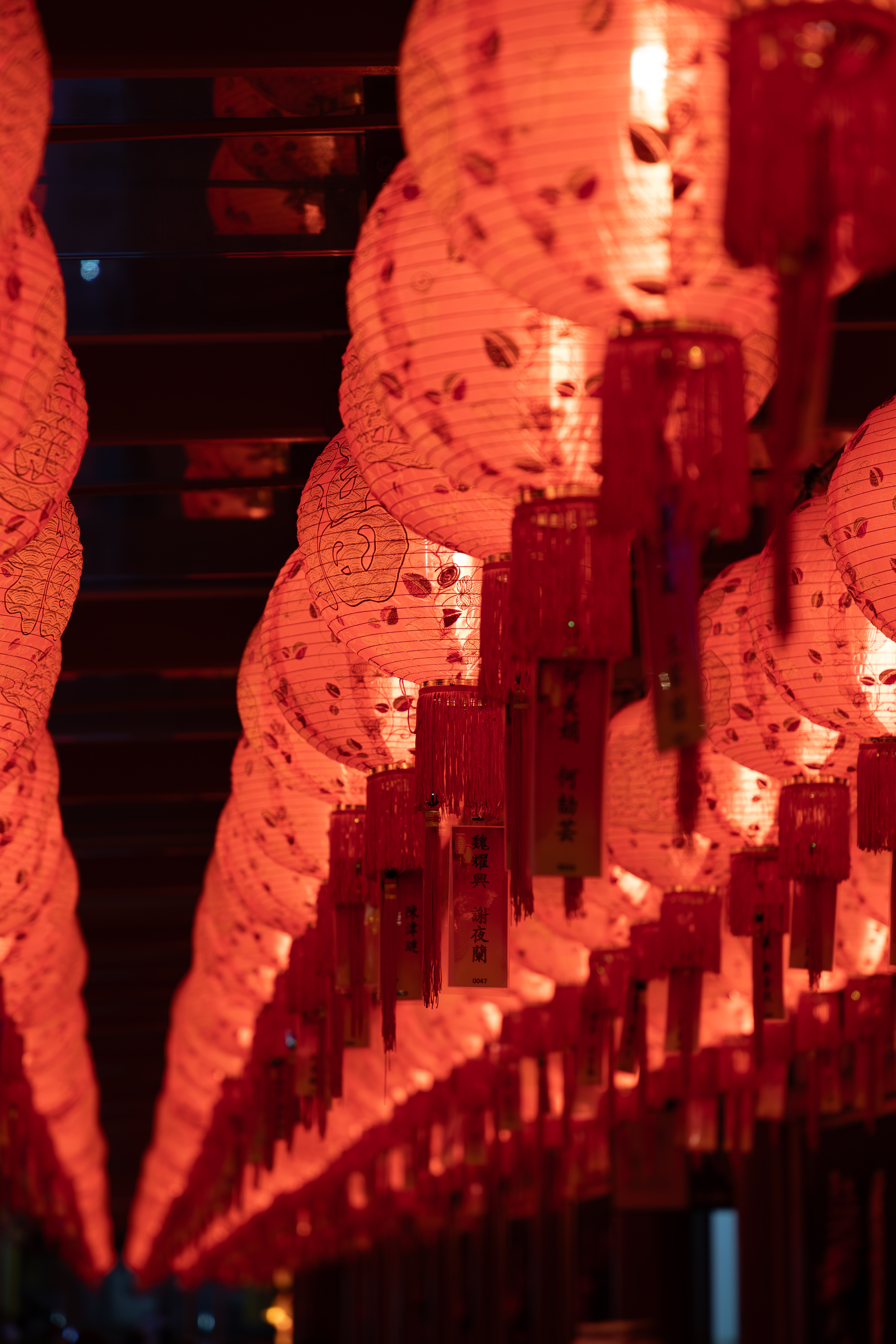
Lanterns at Buddha Tooth Relic Temple in Chinatown, Singapore

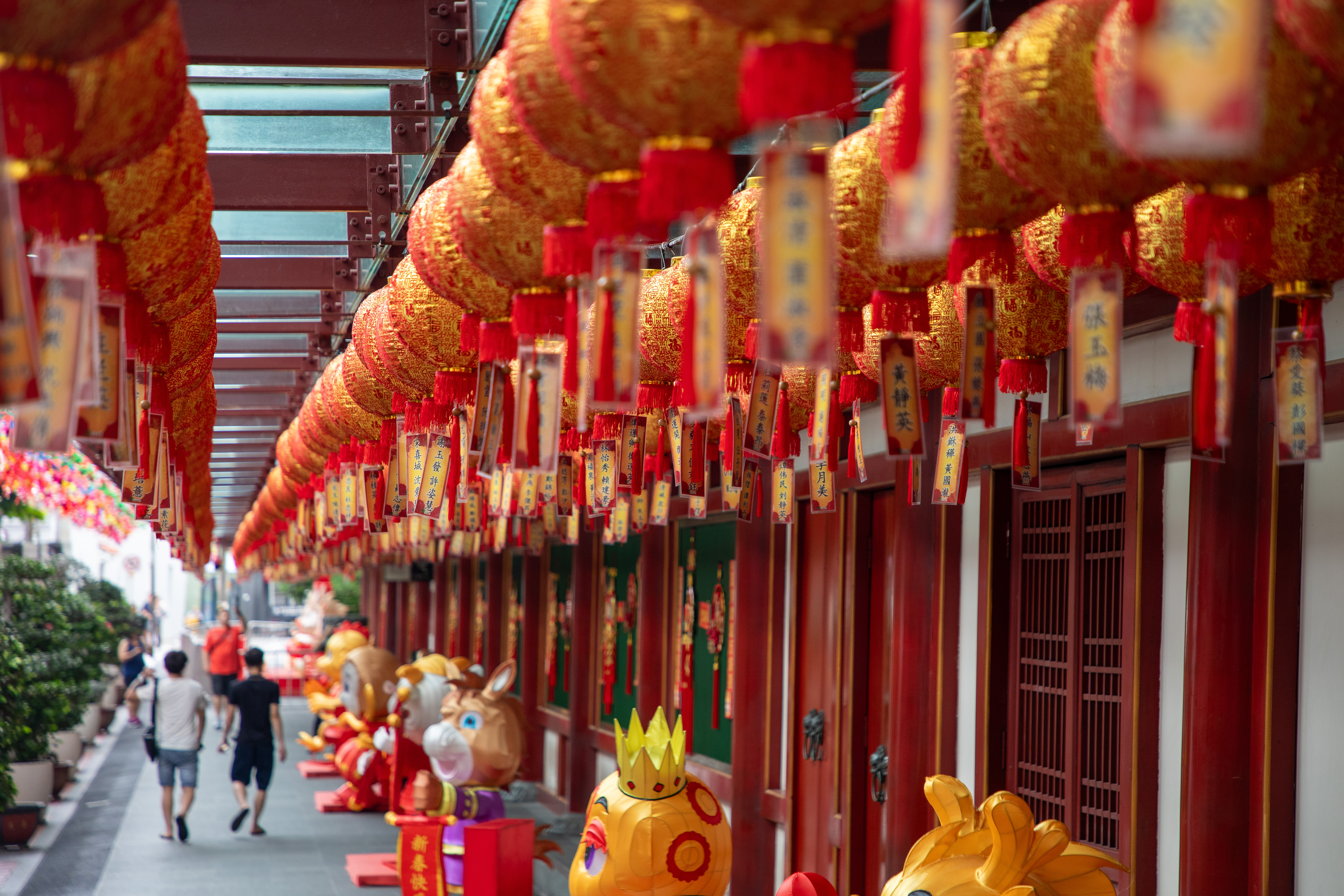
Lanterns at Buddha Tooth Relic temple

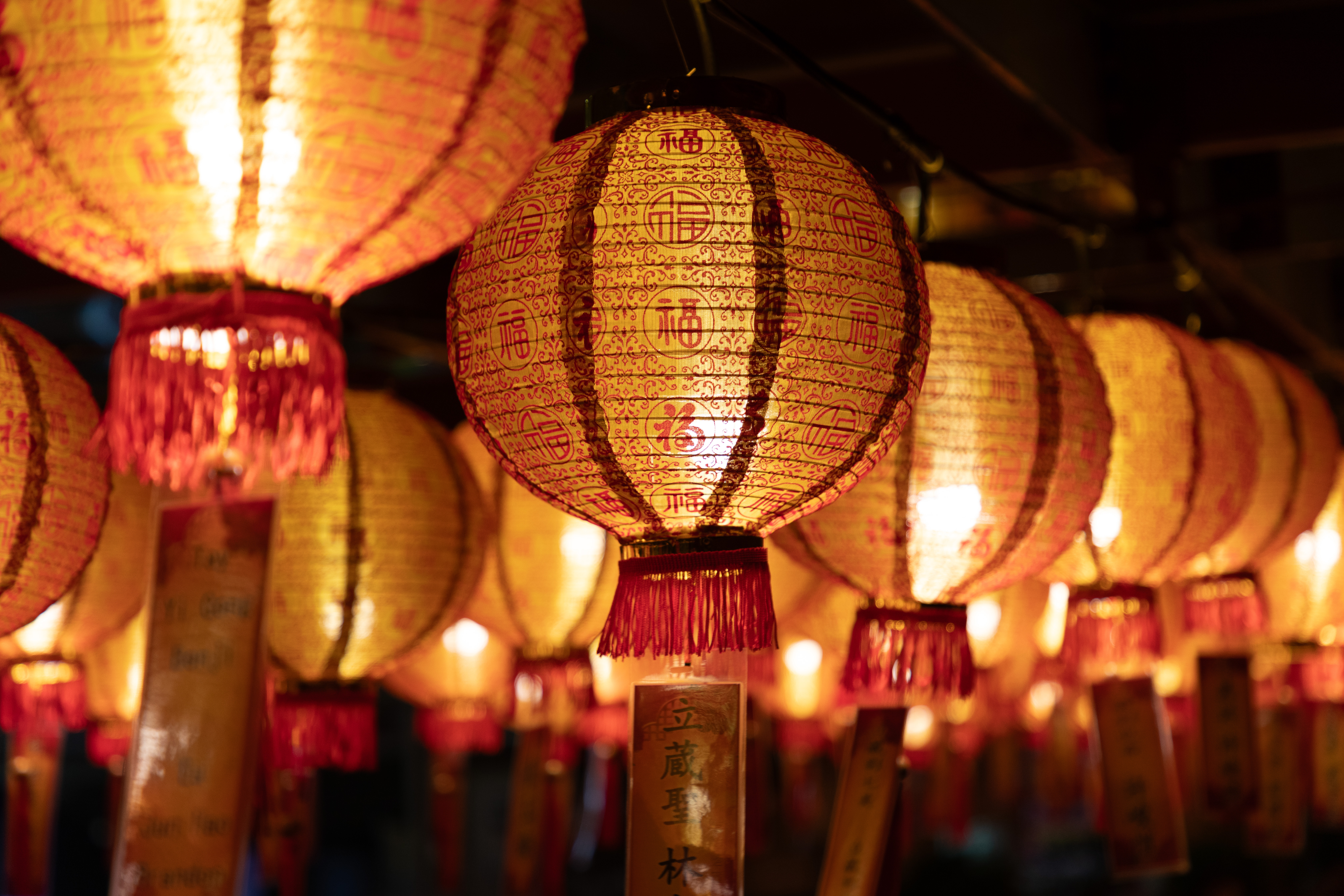
Lanterns in Singapore during Chinese New Year

=== South Asia ===
==== India ====
In India, star shaped paper lanterns hold cultural and religious significance and are widely used during festivals, particularly Diwali—the Hindu Festival of Lights. These lanterns, known locally as kandil or akash kandil in Maharashtra, are traditionally hung outside homes to symbolise the triumph of light over darkness. They are often handmade and vary in design, with intricate cutwork patterns, vibrant colours, and symmetrical shapes, making them an integral part of the festival's visual celebration of light and joy.

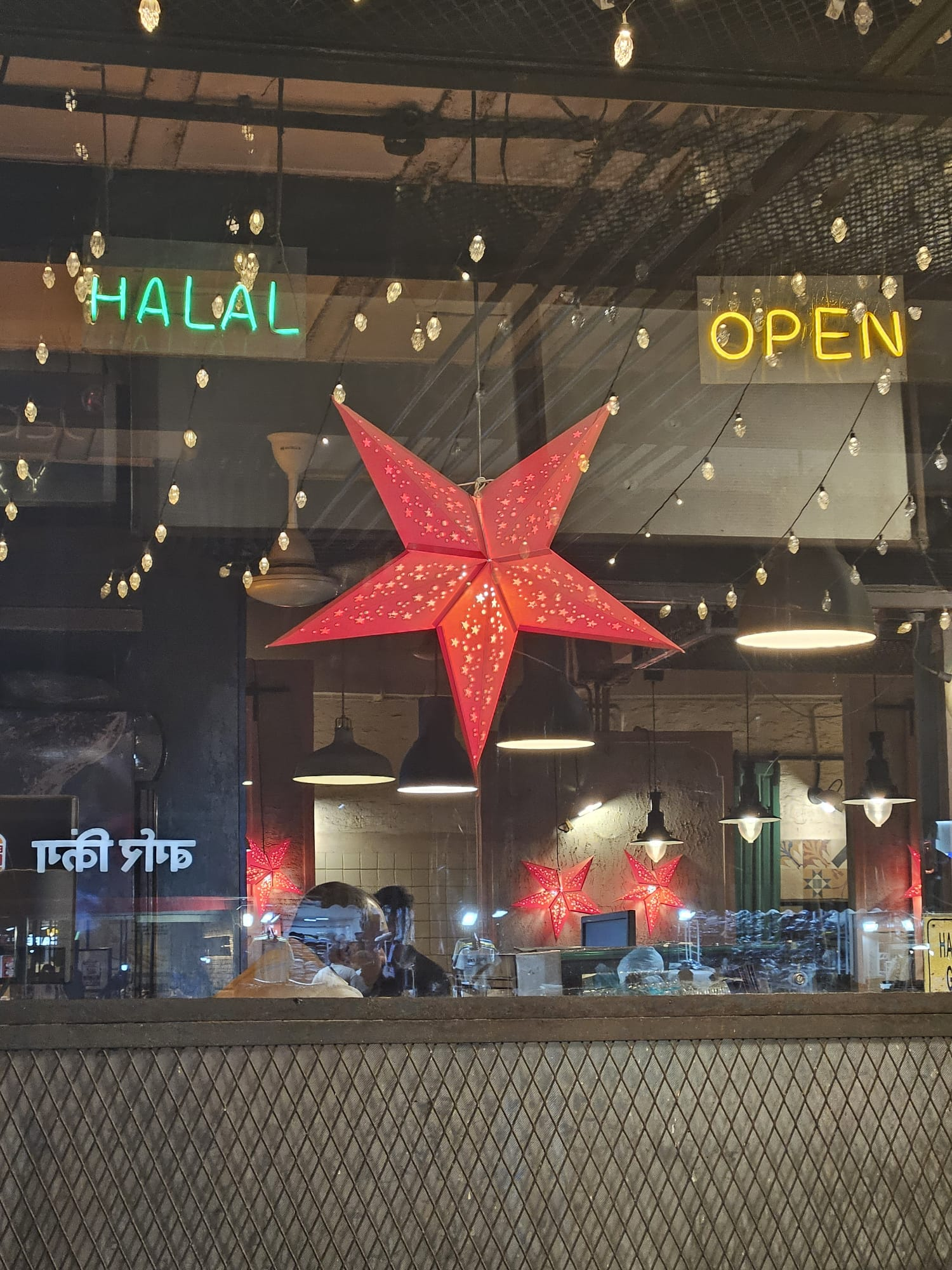
Red paper star lantern in Bandra, Mumbai.

==== Sri Lanka ====
Colorful paper lanterns called Vesak Kuudu are hung outside houses during the Buddhist festival of Vesak.

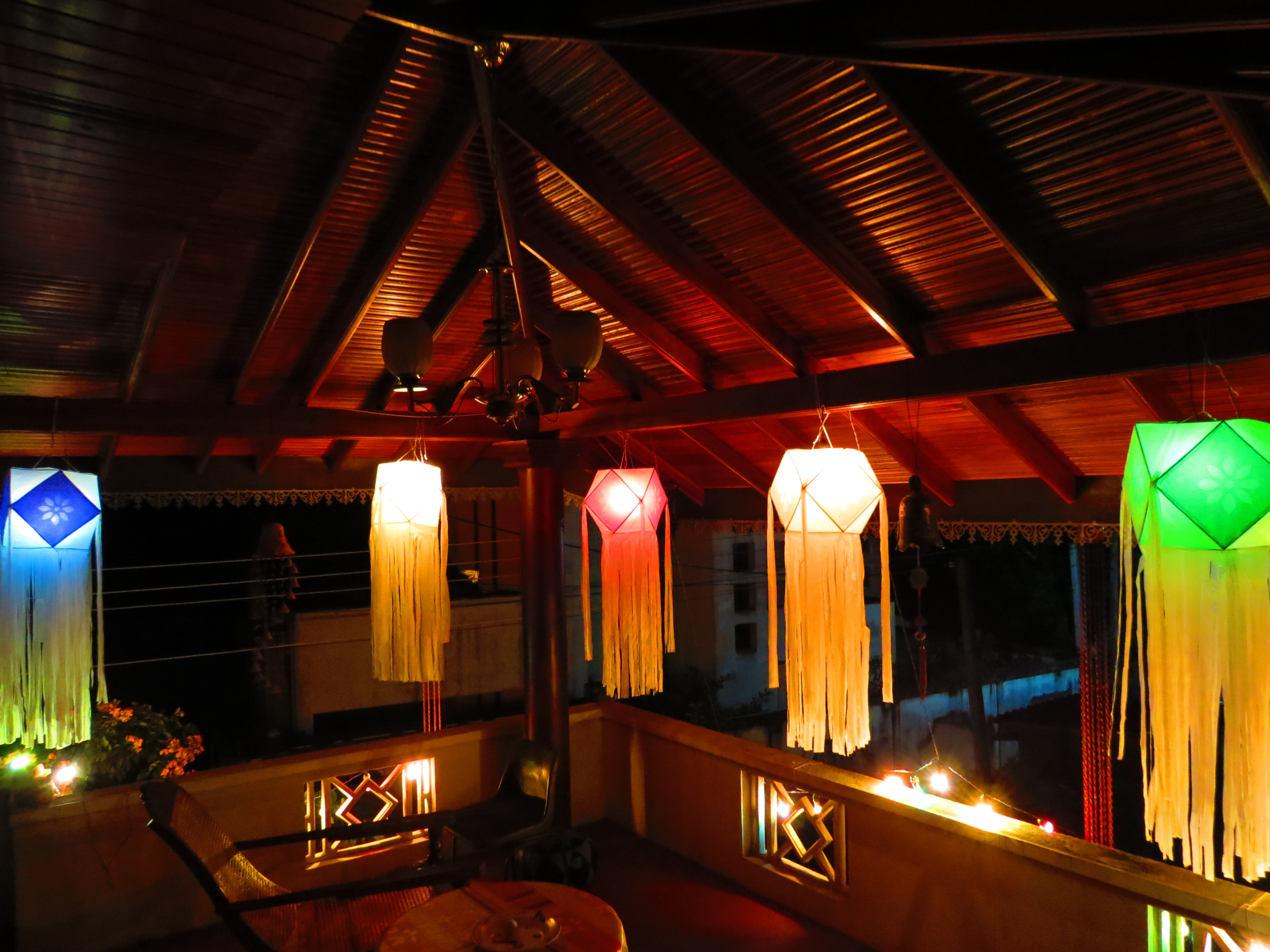
Traditional Vesak lanterns during Vesak in Sri Lanka

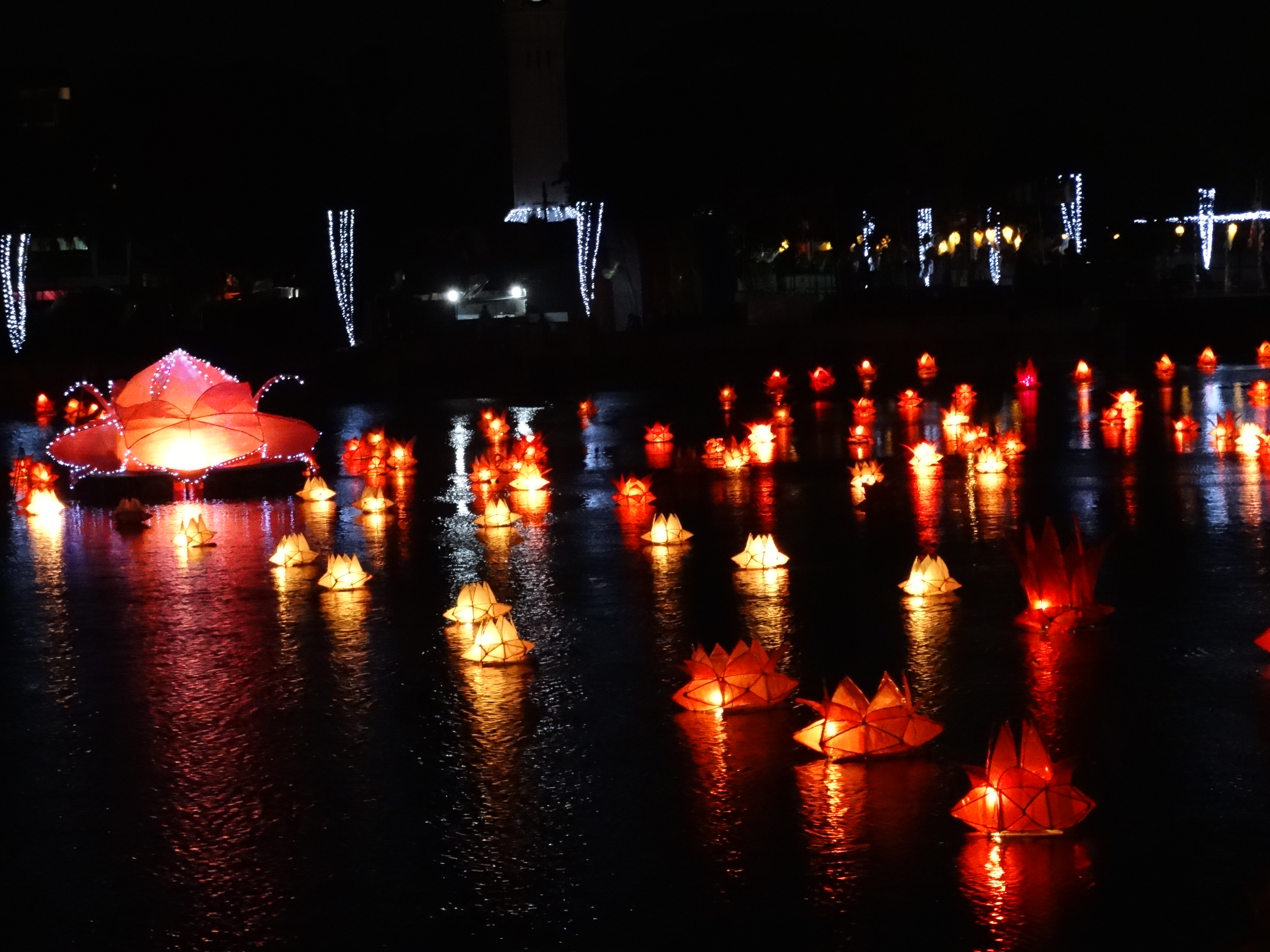
Floating lanterns float along a lake during Vesak in Sri Lanka

=== America ===
==== United States ====
Placing candles or tea lights in a succession of small paper bags (known as luminarias or farolitos) is a common Christmas tradition in New Mexico. The tradition originated from the parol paper lanterns of the Philippines brought over to the Americas during the colonial period.

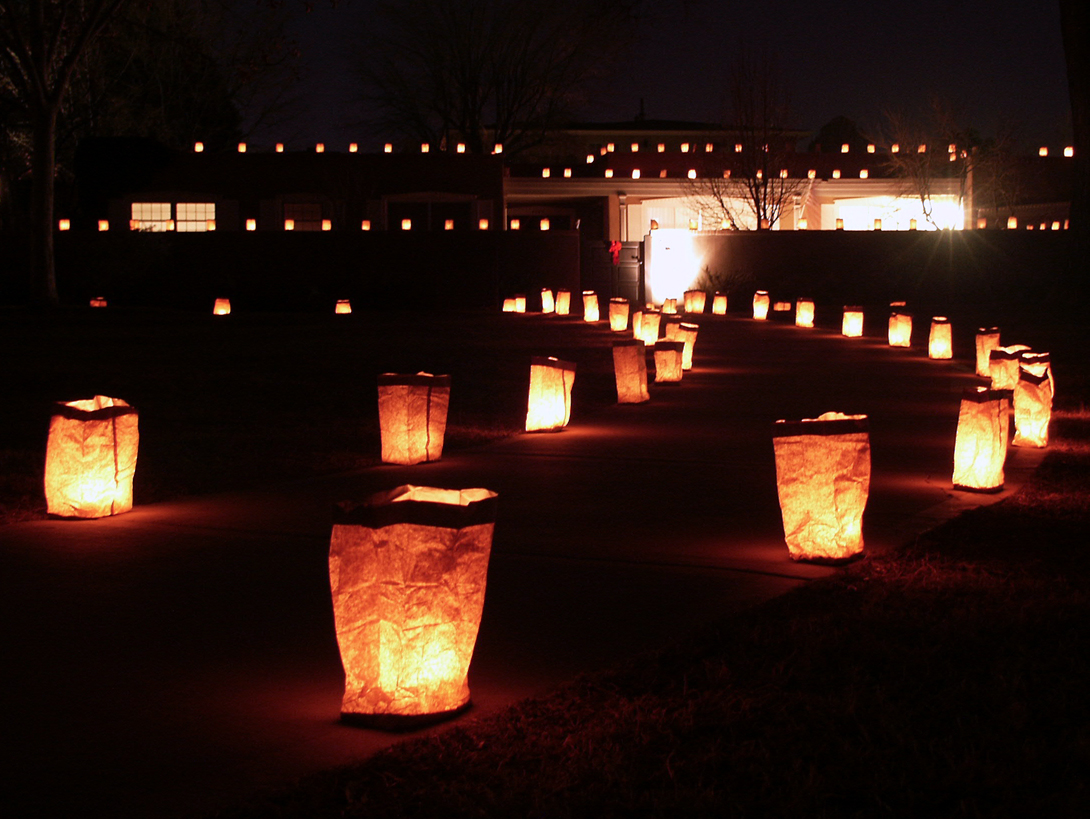
Luminarias during Christmas in Albuquerque, New Mexico

== In photography ==
High-wattage paper lanterns are commonly used in lighting for motion picture productions. Commonly referred to as "China balls", they provide soft, edgeless light to a scene.

== See also ==
- Color in Chinese culture
- Jack-o'-lantern
- Kamifūsen
- Lantern
- Lantern Festival
- Luminaria
- Parol
- Sky lantern
- Types of Indian lamps
- Water lantern
