= Kandeel =

Lantern featured in Diwali

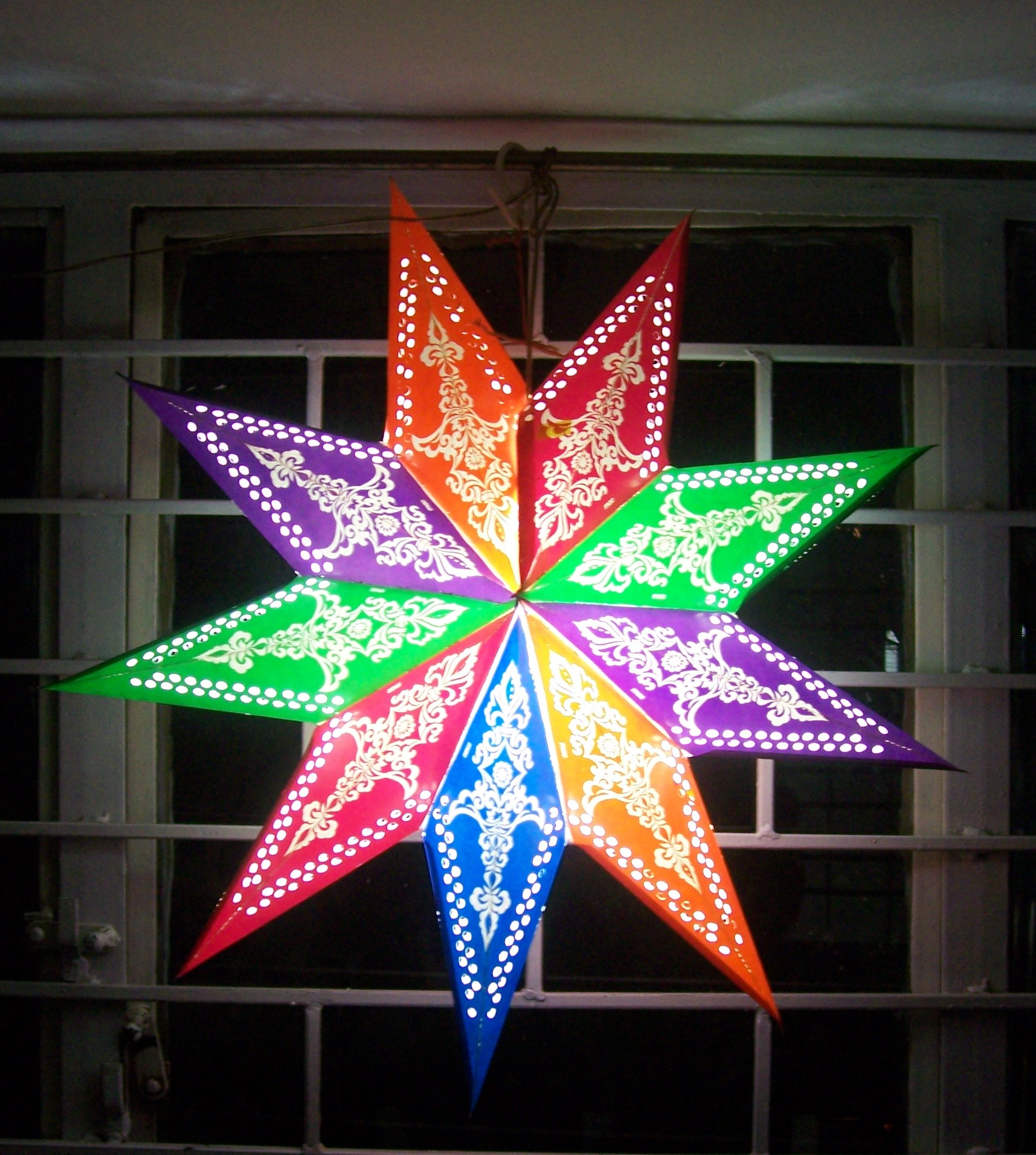
Diwali is a festival of lights; across India people celebrate it via symbolic diyas or kandils (colorful paper lanterns) as an integral part of Diwali decorations.

A kandeel is a type of lamp traditionally used in India. Usually made with a wooden framework and embellished with vibrant paper or cloth, a kindeel is a decorative lantern. Traditionally, during the Hindu festival of lights, Diwali, these lanterns are placed in front of houses. A kandeel is called "akasha deepa," which means "lantern of the sky," and is also called "akash diwa" (sky light) in Sanskrit. It is referred to as "Nakshatra Gudu" (star-like nest) or "Goodu Deepa" (nested light) in Kannada. The idea of akasha deepa as a "lantern of the sky" or "Akasha Kindil," connected to celestial light and a connection to loved ones, was reinforced in the past by Hindus who would release kindeels into the sky as a symbolic gesture to invite the spirits of their ancestors to return home during the festival.

In the state of Kerala, especially in Fort Kochi, a city in Ernakulam District, it is known as akasha vilakku. Hindu Vaishyas (Konkani-speaking linguistic minority of Kerala), who had escaped from Goa during the Goa inquisition carried out by the Portuguese invaders, dwelt in Kerala. During the Hindu lunar month of 'Kartika', people used to put akasha deepam, colloquially known in the Konkani dialect as panjire, on rooftops, and light them at night until break of dawn in the nights leading up to the Karthika Paurnami (full moon) day or Dev Dewali day. Earlier, oil lamps were used, which were attached to the panjire; now coloured electric lights are used instead. By lighting the panjire it is believed that during Kartika, the spirits of the dead visit their relatives' houses to wish them well; or that if they are not lit, the dead will curse their relatives to live in darkness through life.

Kandeels are hung for around a month from the first day of Diwali. They are traditionally built in a crystal shape with tails at the bottom; shapes include stars, globes, delicate dotted designs, and simple drawings. Opaque papers cut into a complex design give more beauty to a Kandeel by blocking some of the light behind it.
