= Henry Halstead =

American bandleader (1897–1984)

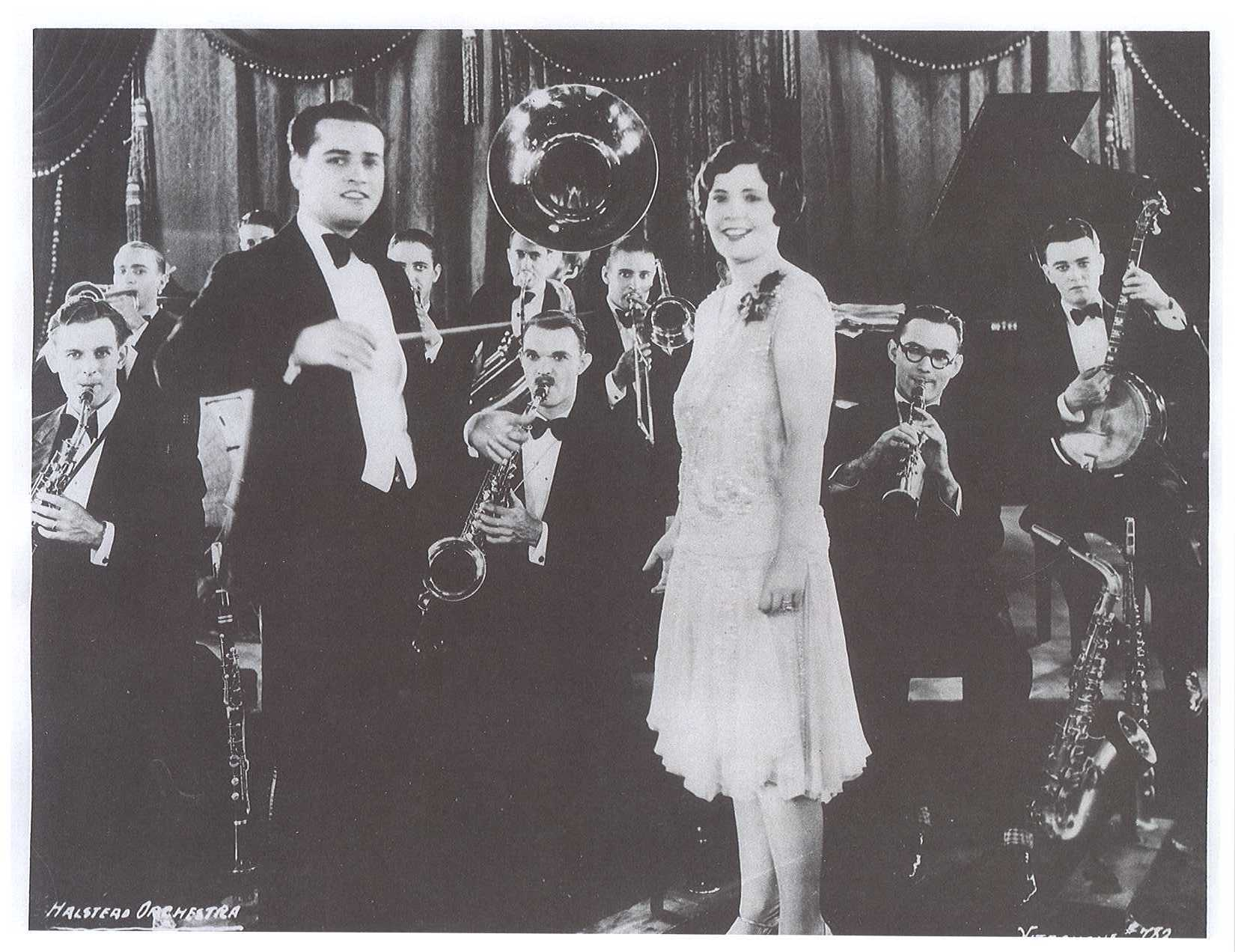
- Henry Halstead Orchestra

Background information
- Born: November 16, 1897; El Paso, Texas, U.S.
- Died: March 19, 1984 (aged 86) California
- Genre: Dance
- Occupation: Bandleader
- Instrument: Violin
- Label: Victor

Henry Halstead (November 16, 1897 – March 19, 1984) was an American bandleader. His orchestra began in early 1922 and over the next twenty years had regular engagements at hotels in New York and California.

Halstead had from 15 to 20 band members at any given time. His orchestra appeared in numerous short subjects on the screen and made over 100 records, mainly with Victor Records. He appeared in short films released by RKO Radio.

After rising to fame on radio and on the west coast, his orchestra was named the Favorite Band of Movieland. His fans included Marion Davies, Sylvia Sidney, Fredric March, Claudette Colbert, Kay Francis, Rudolph Valentino, Roscoe Arbuckle, Maurice Chevalier, Clark Gable, Norma Shearer, Greta Garbo, Clive Brook, Gary Cooper, Marian Nixon, Jack Oakie, Buddy Rogers, and Ruth Chatterton.

== Career ==
Henry Halstead was born November 16, 1897, in El Paso, Texas, and died on March 19, 1984, in California. As a young boy, he learned to play violin. After studying the violin for ten years, he turned professional when at 19, playing clubs and hotels. In 1919, he played violin Abe Lyman and Gus Arnheim. They were in a band at the Sunset Inn in Santa Monica, California, with Lyman on drums Gus Arnheim on piano. Roy Fox played the trumpet on occasion with them.

In 1923 Halstead, then director of the Palais Royal Orchestra, predicted for the coming year that even though dance steps may change, the tempo and rhythm will remain about the same as in 1922. And jazz, minus the shrieking and wailing, toned down with even a touch more of the classical than the case in the year now coming to a close, will continue to reign supreme in the popularity of dance fans. "Balance of harmony is the secret," Mr. Halstead said. "Careful selection of instruments and musicians are next in importance, but unless harmony is perfectly balanced, that soft, dreamy effect so necessary in the modern fox trot is lost." The Buescher phone, an unusual instrument for a dance orchestra, is featured in the Palais Royal Orchestra.

The early Henry Halstead Orchestra during the early 1920s was enormously successful at the St. Francis Hotel in San Francisco for about three years. He broadcast on KGO in San Francisco for about an hour a night, six nights a week. His band became the best known organization in the western United States and Hawaii.

This band broke up in the late summer of 1925. Halstead decided that he would go out on his own and form a band. The band consisted of Abe Maule, Chuck Moll, Craig Leach, Ernie Reed, Glenn Hopkins, Hal Chanslor, Phil Harris, Ross Dugat, Ted Schilling, and Zebe Mann. When they joined Halstead in Seattle, the band was a huge success. In the spring of 1926, the Halstead band went to Los Angeles to play Miller's Lafayette. Red Nichols joined the band for this opening.

While Halstead and his family were living in San Bernardino, California, he and his band were playing at some of the local night spots in town. He needed to live close due to his ailing parents. In March 1944 he was making visits to one of the local mountain communities by the name of Big Bear. He enjoyed the area and was losing many of his band members to the draft. He himself was beyond the draft age and did not serve in World War II. It was a time for change and he moved his family to Big Bear Lake where he bought into a partnership on one of the local night spots known as Navajo Ballroom.

By May 1946 Halstead sold his interest in the Navajo Ballroom and entered into a partnership with Etienne Noir in the local airport. While at the airport he met an old Hollywood acquaintance by the name of Andy Devine who was active in making western films and TV shows. Devine had a partnership in a pilot school with a Hollywood stunt pilot by the name of Dick Probert. The three of them entered into a partnership in the airport and a local restaurant by the name of the Sportsman's Tavern.

Upon leaving the Big Bear area, Halstead and his family moved to San Francisco, where he booked talent at the St. Francis Hotel for a couple of years. For a short time they were in Los Angeles and then by 1953 he was working at the Westward Ho Talent Booking in Phoenix, Arizona. From February 1955 to November 1958 he was owner and operating broker of a real estate company in the Phoenix area. The sign for his real estate office was a yellow sign of a music note. Hasltead was color blind and the only color he could easily see was yellow.

== Personal life and death ==
Halstead was married to blues vocalist Marjorie Whitney Halter, who sang with the King's Jesters. She was born on April 5, 1917. Henry and Marjorie had two children. While they were living in San Bernardino, California, Joan Susan Halstead was born in 1943. Hank Jr. was born on April 8, 1946, while the family was living in Big Bear, California. Marjorie and Henry divorced in the 1960s. Marjorie died on December 26, 1996. After the divorce, Henry married Mary Larson on June 20, 1980.

After Halstead and Marjorie were divorced, Halstead continued in the real estate business. He worked with Del Webb in creating the Deer Valley section of Phoenix. He was honored by having one of the streets named after him: West Halstead Drive. In the late 1960s Henry moved to California. He lived in San Diego for a short time, and died in Hemet, California. He is buried in San Diego.

Many vocalists and entertainers performed with the Henry Halstead Orchestra. Maxine Harding with her deep-dyed blues singing was a soloist with Henry Halstead's Orchestra. Clarence Rand was featured, so was Myrtle Harwin, Niela Goodelle, Margaret Reed, and Peggy Mann.

The orchestra performed at the Blossom Room at Hotel Roosevelt, New York City; the Beverly Wilshire Hotel in Beverly Hills, California; the St. Francis Hotel in San Francisco; the Blackstone Hotel in Chicago; and a season at Fatty Arbuckle's "Plantation" in Culver City where such entertainers as Al Jolson, Sophie Tucker, Gus Edwards, and Leatrice Joy were headliners on his shows.

Hollywood actor Lew Ayres was discovered in the Henry Halstead band in 1927. Ayres said "I was a member of Henry Halstead's orchestra in 1927 at the Mission Beach Ballroom, San Diego, California...summer. My instruments were tenor banjo, long-neck banjo and guitar. After a hiatus, I rejoined Mr. Halstead with a new group, including Phil Harris, on New Years Eve the same year for the opening night of the Beverly Wilshire Hotel... a memorable occasion." Henry Halstead is given credit for making the first Hollywood Vitaphone movie short with Warner Brothers in 1927 called Carnival Night in Paris where Lew Ayres was discovered playing banjo. The three music selections for the Vitaphone production where listed as follows: 1. Volga Boatman, 2. At Sundown, 3. Rosy Cheeks.

Halstead was on the cover of Billboard issue of July 27, 1935 at that time known as Henry "Hank" Halstead and His Cocoanut Grove Orchestra playing at the Hotel-Park Central, New York.

Phil Harris played drums and Red Nichols played trumpet as they were members of Henry Halstead's band in the 1920s.

Cliff Arquette an actor, comedian, was also a night club pianist, and joined the Henry Halstead Orchestra in 1923.

Halstead recorded for Victor Records, and broadcast on all major radio networks, such as Columbia, National, and Mutual Broadcasting Companies. Halstead led his band and played violin. The original Halstead violin still exists and has dozens of band member signatures on the violin. Henry was considered one of the best young band leaders and gave his dance patrons plenty of entertainment. His music maintained excellent rhythm and a crowded floor throughout the night stood testimony that he was playing good dance music.
