= Guildhawk =

British translations and language services company

- Type: Independent
- Industry: Technology
- Founded: 2001; 25 years ago
- Headquarters: London, United Kingdom
- Area served: Worldwide
- Key people: Jurga Žilinskienė (CEO and Founder)
- Services: Technology; Translation; Interpreting; Localisation; Risk Management; Consultancy; Transcreation; Voiceover; Subtitling
- Website: guildhawk.com

Guildhawk, is a global technology led language services agency, headquartered in the City of London. The company was founded by Jurga Zilinskiene in 2001, and has developed into an international agency with multiple locations and over 3,000 staff, providing digital transformation, human and AI machine translation, digital human twins, transliteration of songs and scripts, interpreting, consulting localisation, voiceover, subtitling and more in over 200 languages. The firm uses database software Zilinskiene designed and evolved from the start of the business.

Guildhawk, through its research division known as Gai Labs, has developed productivity software and algorithms to manage people and information and in 2019 won government backing for a Knowledge Transfer Partnership in collaboration with Sheffield Hallam University to develop a new software platform to manage people in the Gig economy. Innovate UK Scale-up Edge has backed the company to scale its new GAI AI-translation SaaS solution called GAI Translate powered by NLP and GPT technology. The solution won the Market Disruptor Award 2025 at the Safety & Security Entrepreneur Awards for providing a secure translation solution for professionals in high-risk industries. In 2025, Innovate UK named Sheffield Hallam University and Guildhawk as one of fifty of the most successful knowledge transfer partnerships in the 50 year history of the programme for development of the GAI Translate software.

Previously known as Today Translations and Today Advisory, the company underwent a full corporate rebrand in June 2019, including the new name, Guildhawk. The rebrand process took two years, after the company determined that "translations" was a limiting term which did not reflect the scope of the company's services.

The word Guildhawk is a registered trade mark with the UK Intellectual Property Office number UK00003395877. The symbol of the Guildhawk Girl with a Red Scarf is also a registered design of the company registered trade mark number UK00003395936.

== History ==
Guildhawk was founded under the name Today Translations in London by Jurga Zilinskiene in 2001. Zilinskiene funded the establishment of the company with £13,000 of her own savings.

In 2003, Zilinskiene received a Shell LiveWIRE award for Young Entrepreneurs for the early success of the company.

In June 2014, Guildhawk hosted representatives from the Greater Houston Women's Chamber of Commerce (GHWCC), organising and participating in a series of site visits across London. The events culminated with Today Translations announcing the founding of a London-based commerce organisation for women.

The company featured on BBC News when a story about hiring the world's first Emoji Translator, Keith Broni went viral in 2016. The Victoria and Albert museum and Guildhawk hosted an event as part of the Friday Late events and Guildhawk provides media commentary on the evolution of emojis that gains international coverage. The use of certain emojis for humorous purposes and with sexual connotations is popular question that Guildhawk is asked about.

In June 2019, the company rebranded as Guildhawk Limited to reflect that the company's offerings extended beyond just translation. The company's vision and values were captured in a one minute film called, 'Making Hopes Become Achievable' that followed the journey of a young girl and boy. The film was produced by Lipsync Productions using back projection techniques that were explained in a subsequent film called, 'Secrets of Cinematic Storytelling'.

Responding to the impact of the global pandemic, in March 2020, Guildhawk pivoted its operations by launching two new technology products called Guildhawk Aided and Text Perfect, providing translations of medical research documents and moving staff to remote work.

== Corporate identity ==
=== Software development ===
Guildhawk uses a range of software solutions and has also developed code and algorithms to which it owns the rights. These include launching Guildhawk Aided and Text Perfect during the pandemic and Zilinskiene was quoted by Bloomberg as saying, “Instead of looking at tech as some kind of monster to take away your job, now the tech is the hero.” In 2020, the company launched Guildhawk Voice, a new service producing authentic looking digital twin avatars of humans created using AI-powered technology that instantly turns text into speech in many languages and used to create multilingual videos. One avatar was used to open a formal online meeting to establish a new Joint Venture between Gammon Construction and Guildhawk, backed by the Department for International Trade in Hong Kong. The digital twin avatar of the Chairman of the Fraud Advisory Panel was used to provide his Chairman's address at the 2021 AGM.

In 2019, Guildhawk and Sheffield Hallam University won Government funding via Innovate UK to develop a new business management software platform to power the Gig Economy. The design and development team for the Yorkshire project were recruited and in December 2020 the team was expanded.

On 17 February 2021, in an interview with ICAEW on measuring employee productivity at home during the COVID-19 pandemic, CEO Zilinskiene described how before the pandemic, Guildhawk started towards remote work. She explained that technology was used to focus was on the output of its employees, "not to police them, but rather to understand the impact of how they work". Weekly online CEO briefings and constant dialogue between employees and their managers was also cited as a means to improve efficiency and communication. These initiatives enabled the company to record an 18% increase in overall productivity since staff started remote work.

Speaking at Sheffield Hallam University on 25 January 2022 on the future of corporate avatars, CEO Zilinskiene announced that Guildhawk would be the first company in the world to create authentic virtual human twins of all staff that would like one. This was to help Guildhawk staff create immersive multilingual avatar videos and communicate in the new metaverse in more than 50 languages.

=== Next-Generation Digital Technology for Smart Cities ===
The Balfour Beatty annual report 2021 describes how the Gammon Guildhawk JV would 'accelerate the creation of ... Smart Cities. Using Guildhawk’s AI technology, Gammon is using multilingual information to link data from built assets to digital twins – digitised versions of manuals or PDF drawings. This enables optimisation of all interactions with these buildings, whether in terms of access to and sharing of data, avoidance of costly and potentially dangerous errors, or insights into more efficient maintenance. It allows people to be trained using systems developed using Guildhawk’s ... data lake, avatars and AI, bringing essential training to life'.

=== Promoting the arts and music ===
Through its founder Jurga Zilinskiene MBE and the Advisory Board Members actor Sir Timothy Ackroyd, playwright Roger James Elsgood and executive TV producer Amanda Murphy and others, Guildhawk is an active supporter of the arts and music. This emphasis is closely aligned to the philanthropic aims of the Ackroyd Trust which helps drama students entering their final year of training and The John Ackroyd Scholarship at the Royal College of Music. It also reflects the creative translation, localisation and transliteration of song lyrics, books and scripts that Guildhawk provides for partners in the music and entertainment industry.

Guildhawk and its Advisory Board have co-produced and sponsored a number of charitable and commercial events with young actors and musicians including the Courage & Benevolence Ball in 2012, 'Dracula in the Dark' a play starring actor John Challis also available as an audiobook and the Ackroyd Trust performance at the Royal College of Music in 2014. The company also supported the production of ‘The Fuse’, an atmospheric 1940s radio theatre production portraying the bizarre trial of murderer Brian Donald Hume and performed live in the West End. A short 1949 film noir shown before the play was produced and directed by Edward Andrews.

To celebrate the art, language and culture of Scotland, the company became an official sponsor of the annual Burns Night Supper that takes place in Vilnius and in 2019 sponsored the translation of the Uzupis Constitution into Scottish Gaelic and artistic tribute that accompanied the unveiling and received media coverage by the BBC and others.

In 2019, Guildhawk supported the British bandleader Alex Mendham & His Orchestra to record and publish Puttin on the Ritz, his new album of hit songs from the 1920s and 30s via a Kickstarter campaign and planning a themed transatlantic crossing to New York aboard Cunard’s Queen Mary 2. The latter included a bon voyage concert at the Lansdown Club in Mayfair, tickets for which were auctioned for charity at the 21st Burns Night Supper in Vilnius on 15 January 2021.

When the COVID-19 pandemic had a devastating impact on the livelihoods of musicians in 2020, Guildhawk’s Director David Clarke and CEO Zilinskiene formed a new company with Alex Mendham called the Mendham Guildhawk Song Company. The first of these songs, recorded and performed in an authentic manner intended to allow listeners to hear music performed as it was in the 1920s was aired in a concert streamed live from the London Music Museum on 12 May 2021. Other innovative techniques were also deployed during the pandemic to enable musicians to perform and for listeners to enjoy the orchestra’s music during the pandemic. These included The Lockdown Broadcast, a 1930s themed radio broadcast arranged using sequences performed by the band individually at home during the pandemic. The work of the orchestra has been described as, “There is a dream-like quality to the group that embodies the charm and luxury of the ’20s and ’30s. With their evocative sound and the magic ability to put you on a Hollywood film set in 1933 or the ballroom of a long-forgotten Mayfair Hotel, Alex Mendham & His Orchestra are leaders in performing music from a golden age"

As participant at the Horasis Global Meeting in June 2021, David Clarke explained how the new artistic collaboration enables the founders to use their combined skills in cultural research, music production, song translation and international trade to create a unique and historic catalogue of hit music from the dawn of the Jazz Age.

=== Security assurance ===
To provide assurance and interoperability through the supply chain, Guildhawk was the first specialist language services provider to achieve independent United Kingdom Accreditation Service - ISO/IEC 27001:2005 certification for data security throughout its global operations transitioning to the 2022 standard in 2025.

Guildhawk also has a global network of subject matter experts, who advise on how to reduce the risk of fraud, bribery and cyber-crime, as well as how to enhance multilingual communication. They also provide thought leadership on due-diligence and business integrity. On 18 January 2018, the Fraud Advisory Panel charity appointed Guildhawk director David Clarke as its chairman.

During the COVID-19 pandemic, the company deployed its expertise in multilingual communications to produce a series of free health and safety notices that were made available to the public and business. Guildhawk also provided a series of online briefings to advise companies and the Law Society on measures to protect their information and avoid cyber attacks and fraud during the crisis. In March 2021, Economia magazine interviewed Director David Clarke his four lessons the UK should learn from COVID fraud. The company's external Legal Counsel and board member Arun Chauhan, a solicitor specialising in fraud litigation and regulatory compliance matters makes regular appearances at events and on BBC Radio and television providing advice to businesses and consumers.

On 30 March 2020, CEO Jurga Zilinskiene MBE and Chairman Ian Miller MBE wrote a letter to Prime Minister Boris Johnson to caution him that, "vulture funds" will use the crisis to "acquire, asset-strip and neutralise good companies". Its warnings fell on deaf ears. Zilinskiene had previously written to the Prime Minister to suggest steps the government could take to help UK companies boost international trade after leaving the European Union. The letters followed two meeting with the Prime Minister at 10 Downing Street.

=== Quality assurance ===
Guildhawk is certified to ISO 9001, the international standard for Quality Management. The company uses database software Zilinskiene designed and developed herself, which adheres to the standard.

=== Promoting international trade ===
Guildhawk has been recognised on several occasions for its dedication to promoting international trade, receiving a UK Trade & Investment Certificate of Appreciation presented by Prince Philip, Duke of Edinburgh in 2006, and the Council of British Chambers of Commerce in Europe (COBCOE) 'Make Europe Work' award for Breakthrough Trade in 2015.

In 2019, Her Majesty the Queen honoured Guildhawk, under its former name of Today Translations, with the Queen's Award for Enterprise, in the International Trade category. It is awarded to companies who have achieved outstanding growth in overseas earning, and shown year-on-year growth over at least three years. The Award was formerly presented to members of the company by the Rt Hon Peter Estlin, Lord Mayor of London at Mansion House on 28 October 2019, followed by a further presentation by Paul Double, The Remembrancer of London at Guildhall. International trade development activities include organising and hosting the first British Trade Mission to Lithuania and a bi-lateral trade Mission to the UK with the Greater Houston Women's Chamber of Commerce (GHWCC).

In 2019, the Queen also honoured Guildhawk's CEO Zilinskiene with membership of the Most Excellent Order of the British Empire for services to International Trade.

== Awards ==
- Shell LiveWire Award for Young Entrepreneurs in 2003.
- UK Trade & Investment Certificate of Appreciation, presented by Prince Philip, Duke of Edinburgh in 2006.
- COBCOE 'Make Europe Work' award for Breakthrough Trade in 2015.
- Queen's Award for Enterprise: International Trade 2019
- Security and Safety Entrepreneur Awards 2025: Winner of the Market Disruptor Award for GAI Translate

== Associations ==
Guildhawk is a member of the Association of Translation Companies, and the European Association of Translation Companies. It was also a strategic partner of the Council of British Chambers of Commerce in Europe (COBCOE) prior to the merger into the British Chambers of Commerce.

== Locations ==
=== United Kingdom ===
- London
- Sheffield

=== Worldwide ===
- Kaunas, Lithuania

== Media and press ==
The company was noted in the media for polls to find the 'world's most untranslatable word' and another to identify 'the world's most romantic word'.

It has also attracted press attention for other events, including the hiring of regional Geordie, Glaswegian, and Scouse translators. They have also advertised for speakers of Brooklynese. The company maintains that its regional recruitment campaign was motivated by a genuine need to enable foreign business people to do business more easily in the regions. According to Zilinskiene, "We are aware that some of our foreign and UK clients can find the Glaswegian accent difficult to decipher. While it's unusual for us to want someone to translate a dialect of English, there is a clear demand".

In November 2016, Guildhawk advertised for 'the world's first emoji translator', which received widespread media coverage. As a result of the unusual job advertisement, Zilinskeine appeared on BBC News, ITV News, and Vice News, as well as several radio stations. According to Zilinskiene, the position is intended to address the "emerging area of confusion" around the usage and meanings of emojis in different cultures.

Guildhawk and its experts are frequently featured in television and online news articles that range in diversity from the evolution of words and language to technology, entrepreneurship and international trade.

The company funded the professional translation of the Constitution of the Republic of Užupis into Scottish Gaelic which is inscribed on a plaque that was unveiled at a ceremony on 25 January 2019, to mark the birth date of the Scottish poet Robert Burns. The company has also supported the Annual Burns Night Supper celebrations and charity fundraising event held in Vilnius in partnership with the British Chamber of Commerce in Lithuania.

== Philanthropy ==
Guildhawk supports several charitable causes, including donating a percentage of its profits to The Fairtrade Foundation and sponsoring HRH Prince William's charity the Tusk Trust and the Courage & Benevolence Ball with Sir Timothy Ackroyd in aid of the Debra charity.

The company supports those who have served in the police and armed forces by sponsoring charitable police and military events and providing training and employment opportunities for military veterans as a signatory to the Armed Forces Covenant.

In November 2019, Guildhawk supported Sheffield company Twinkl to enter the Guinness Book of Records with the most people singing relay in multiple songs.

== See also ==
- Jurga Zilinskiene
