= Hot Lips =

1922 song by Henry Busse, Henry Lange, Lou Davis

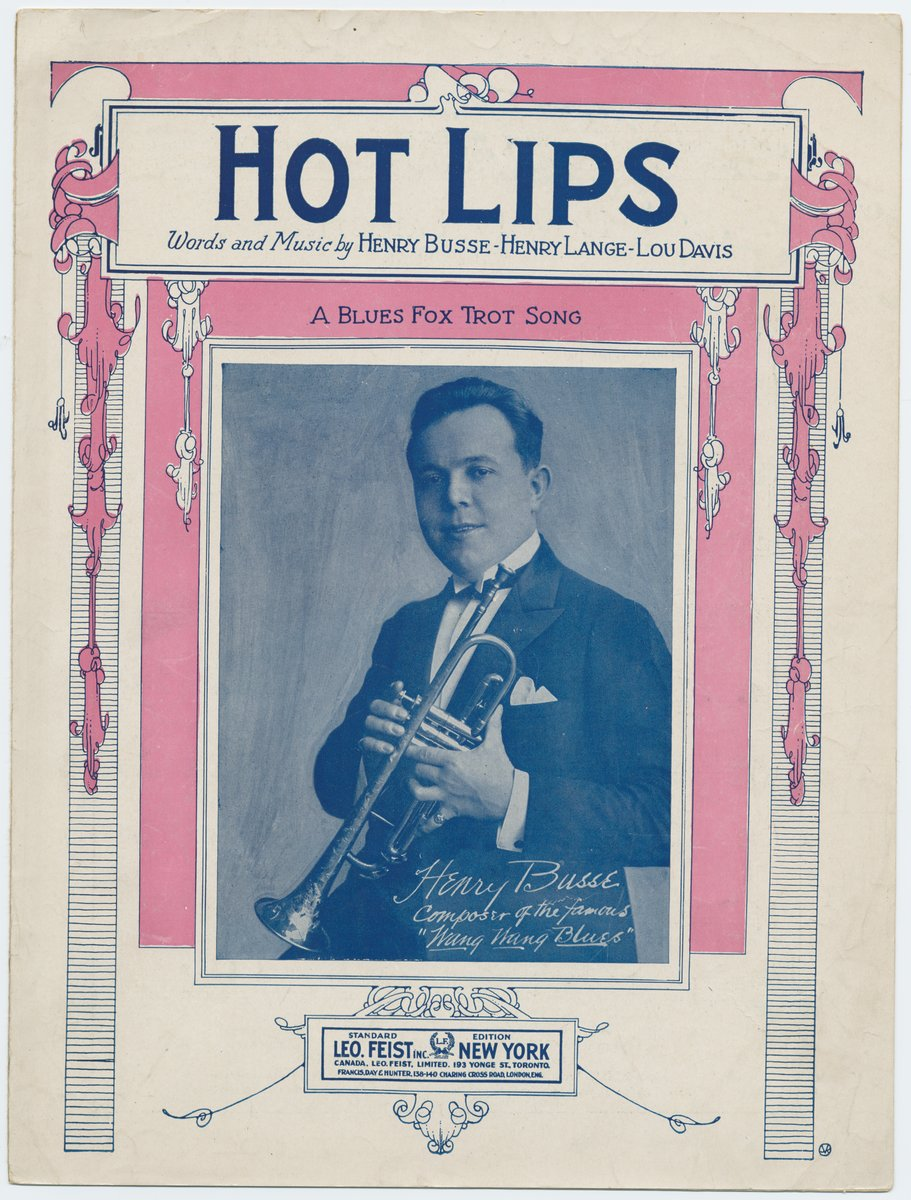

Song by Paul Whiteman and His Orchestra
- B-side: "Send Back my Honeyman"
- Published: September 19, 1922 by Leo Feist, Inc., New York
- Released: September 1922
- Recorded: June 23, 1922
- Genre: Swing
- Length: 3:19
- Label: Victor 18920
- Composer(s): Henry Busse, Henry Lange
- Lyricist(s): Lou Davis

Hot Lips
Performed by Paul Whiteman and his Orchestra, Victor 18920A, 23 Jun 1922

"Hot Lips" ("When He Plays Jazz He's Got - Hot Lips") or "He's Got Hot Lips When He Plays Jazz" is a popular song written by jazz trumpeter Henry Busse, Henry Lange, and Lou Davis. The song was a number one hit for Paul Whiteman and His Orchestra. Henry Busse was a founding member of the Paul Whiteman Orchestra, joining in 1920.

== First publication ==
Paul Whiteman and His Orchestra recorded the song on June 23, 1922 in New York and released it as a Victor 78, 18920-A. The recording was number one for six weeks.

First published in 1922, it was advertised as "A Blues Fox Trot Song" The song is about a trumpet player. The chorus is:

He's got hot lips— When he plays Jazz
He draws out step,— Like no one has
You're on your toes,— And shake your shoes
Boy, how he goes— When he plays Blues
I watch the crowd— Until he's through
He can be proud— They're "cuckoo,' too
His music's rare You must declare,— The boy is there
With two hot lips, He's got hot lips

== Other recordings ==
The song has been recorded many times. Red Nichols, Al Hirt, Pete Candoli, Horace Heidt, Harry James, the California Ramblers, Miss Patricola on Victor, the Hoosier Hot Shots on Melotone, the Will Lockridge Orchestra on Score Records, and Henry Busse with his orchestra, have all recorded the song.

The original release was by Paul Whiteman and His Orchestra, of which Busse was a member in 1922. He left the Paul Whiteman orchestra in 1928 to form his own group. Lockridge was a Busse trumpeter whose recording of the song was part of an album tribute to Busse shortly after Busse's death in 1955.

1922 release of "Hot Lips (He's Got Hot Lips When He Plays Jazz)" by Paul Whiteman and His Orchestra featuring Henry Busse on trumpet, Victor 18920A.

The song appears in the 1930 Universal Pictures musical revue King of Jazz featuring Paul Whiteman and Bing Crosby.

The Henry Busse Orchestra recorded "Hot Lips" for American Record Corporation (ARC) on June 4, 1934 in Chicago. It was released on the Columbia label, which ARC was in the process of acquiring in a receivership sale; the date of release is unknown. On September 25, Busse's band recorded it again for the newly formed Decca Records (Decca 198), which released it in the United States and in the United Kingdom. The Decca version was later released as a V-Disc, No, 285, in October, 1944 by the U.S. War Department along with "Wang Wang Blues". Columbia Records also released the ARC recording of "Hot Lips" as part of its Columbia Hall of Fame 45 single series.

The Paul Whiteman recording was featured in the Oprah Winfrey movie The Color Purple (1985), directed by Steven Spielberg.

The jazz trumpeter Oran Page reportedly got his nickname "Hot Lips" after diligently practicing Busse's solos on the Paul Whiteman recording of the tune.

A modern recording of this song was released by Alex Mendham & His Orchestra on their 2017 album On With The Show.

== Bibliography ==
- Busse, Henry; Lange, Henry; Davis, Lou. Hot Lips. (sheet music). New York : Leo. Feist, Inc. (1922).
