= Jurga Žilinskienė =

Lithuanian businesswoman

Jurga Zilinskiene MBE
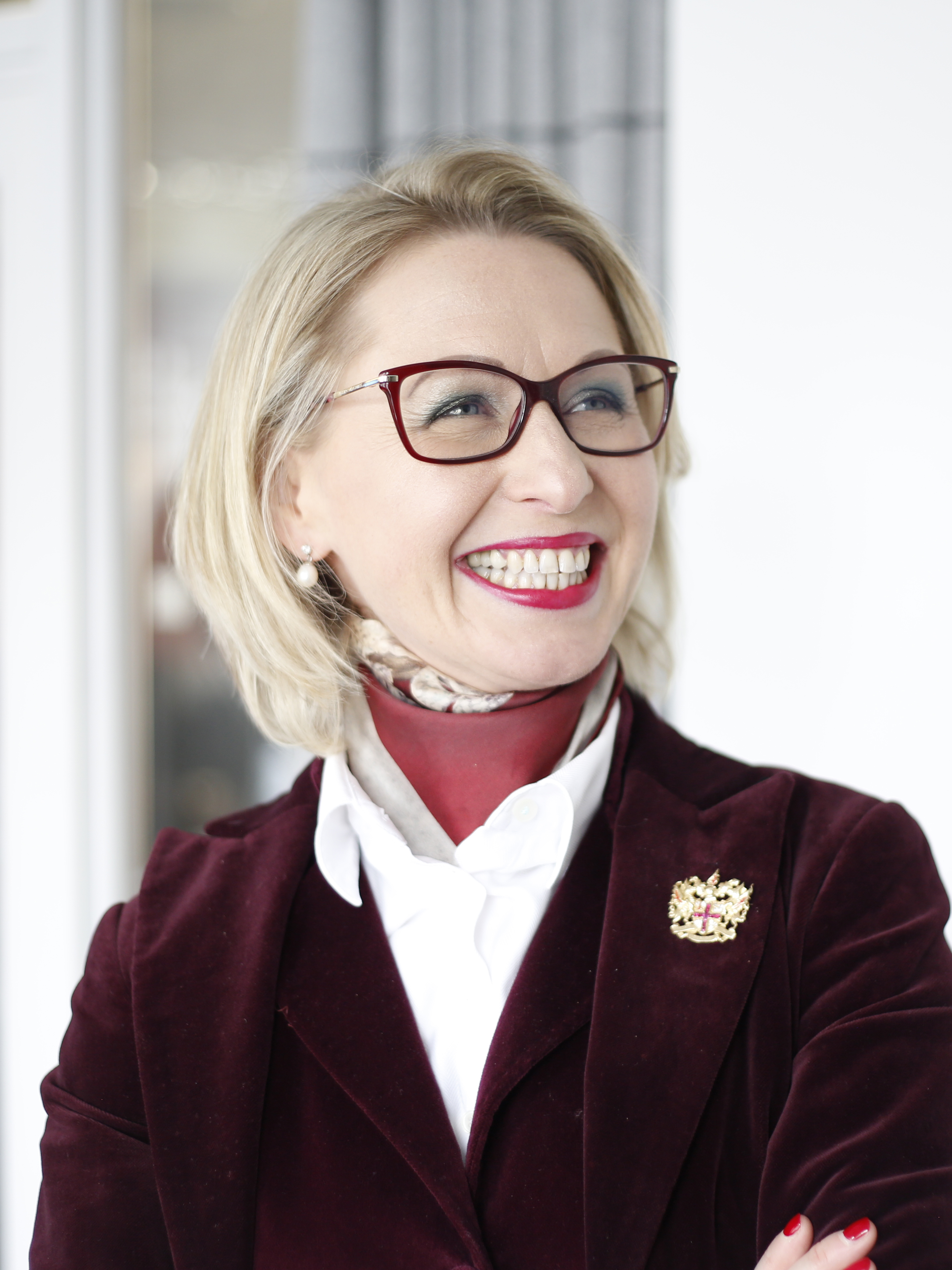
- Born: August 2, 1976 (age 50)
- Education: University of London
- Title: CEO & Founder of Guildhawk
- Spouse: David Clarke
- Awards: Member of the Most Excellent Order of the British Empire (MBE); Named as one of '100 Lithuanian Women' that Lithuania is proud of in 2018; Shell LiveWIRE Award for Young Entrepreneurs; UK Trade & Investment Certificate of Appreciation

Jurga Zilinskiene MBE (Lithuanian: Jurga Žilinskienė, born 2 August 1976) is an entrepreneur, software programmer and founder of Guildhawk, and Gai Labs formerly trading as Today Translations and Today Advisory, a global technology led translation company. In June 2019, she became the first Lithuanian woman to be honoured by HM Queen Elizabeth with the MBE.

On 8 March 2021, Zilinskiene was named as one of eight women who changed history with technology by LRT media. A summation in City AM described Zilinskiene as: '...one hell of a formidable businesswoman... a Lithuanian-born cross between Richard Branson and Margaret Thatcher... combined perhaps with shades of Warren Buffett, whose frugality and dislike of shopping and ostentation she shares'.

Zilinskiene has been interviewed by television, radio stations and international newspapers about Guildhawk and her unconventional approach to business. She has appeared on the BBC and in the Financial Times, the Independent on Sunday, Daily Telegraph and the business website, Growing Business.

In 2018 Zilinskiene was named as one of 100 women that Lithuania is proud of as part of the '100 Lithuanian Women' project. She was awarded an MBE by Queen Elizabeth II in the 2019 Birthday Honours and was invited to give lecturers at Vilnius University Kaunas Faculty, Coventry University and at the 2021 Cambridge International Symposium on Economic Crime, speaking on leadership, entrepreneurship and language technology.

In 2019, she became an ambassador for the Be the Business, the UK productivity movement launched by Sir Charlie Mayfield and is the lead for the Yorkshire region. She features in a series of films and articles about boosting productivity and international trade and advice on recovering from the effects of the pandemic.

She met with Prime Minister Boris Johnson to discuss the impact of Brexit on UK companies and wrote a series of letters to him. These appealed for measures to protect responsible businesses from fraud and exploitation following Brexit and not to bail out unethical companies. A subsequent letter cautioned the government about serious risks arising from the COVID-19 pandemic. Her letters later featured in the Guardian and other news outlets.

== Early life ==
At 19, she moved to Britain to study law and economics at the University of London.

== Guildhawk ==
In 2001, while at university, Zilinskiene set up Guildhawk under the name Today Translations – for which she was awarded the Shell LiveWIRE Award for Young Entrepreneurs in 2003.

Zilinskiene funded the company with £13,000 of personal investment and it continues to operate without external funding. This example of bootstrapping is rare within the city. Currently, the company has a global network of 3,000 translators and interpreters.

Zilinskiene frequently engages in government and media briefings, as well as forums organised by multinational companies. In 2006, Zilinskiene organised a trade mission with over 20 delegates from multinational organisations such as Merrill Lynch, to seize business opportunities in Lithuania. The trade mission involved Lithuanian parliamentarians and British diplomats, causing international media interest. To mark the success of the trip, Zilinskiene was given a UK Trade & Investment Certificate of Appreciation for her contribution to enhancing international trade by Prince Philip, Duke of Edinburgh.

In October 2010, she was nominated to, and accepted, the Freedom of the City of London at a ceremony in the Guildhall, becoming the first female Lithuanian to receive the Freeman title. She was subsequently recognised as a Citizen of London and Liveryman to the Worshipful Company of Fruiterers, one of the city's oldest fellowships and a trade close to Zilinskiene's heart. She also sits on the China Interest Group Committee and her company Guildhawk is an official sponsor of the Fruiterers.

In June 2013, Zilinskiene took part in a panel discussion at Forum One in Kaunas, Lithuania, the biggest business leadership event to ever take place in Eastern Europe. The event featured some of the brightest Lithuanian business minds and a special talk by one of Zilinskiene's business idols, Sir Richard Branson.

In recognition of her sustained business success, Zilinksiene was invited to be part of the judging panel for the Shell LiveWIRE Award for Young Entrepreneurs in 2015, the award she herself received 12 years prior.

In September 2016, Zilinskiene was selected to participate in the Goldman Sachs 10,000 Small Businesses initiative aimed at supporting SMEs. She graduated from the programme in the same year. Shortly afterwards Zilinskiene was also invited to attend an executive education course at Harvard Business School.

== Ethical business philosophy ==
A series of common threads recur through Zilinskiene's life and reflect her business philosophy. Helping her company and other businesses to do business and trade internationally was highlighted in a feature on BBC London News and an article in the Financial Times in 2011, when she explained why she was supporting the Ready to Supply the City initiative with the Corporation of London.

Checking credentials of companies that people work for is very important she explained in an interview with The Guardian in 2004. In an interview with Zmones magazine about her approach to life and business, she stressed the importance of always being ethical and being highly productive in life, saying how good people inspired her, quoting the Chinese philosopher Laozi.

She has also said that fellow British Lithuanian, the late Sir Montague Burton represented the type of business person she wanted to be. Delivering a business speech in Lithuania, she told why she was following 'Monty' and did not admire the practices of Sir Philip Green, who later acquired Burton's fashion empire.

Government support for established, ethical businesses after Brexit and not bailing out unethical heavily leveraged companies was the central message in a letter she wrote to Prime Minister Boris Johnson following her two-round table meetings with him in September 2019. She also called on government to ensure banks did more to protect small businesses from falling prey to fraud by introducing Confirmation of Payee technology that was delayed.

In two subsequent letters she and her Chairman Ian Miller MBE wrote to the Prime Minister in March as the COVID-19 pandemic struck the UK, she appealed for urgent help for small companies and cautioned that, “vulture funds” will use the crisis to “acquire, asset-strip and neutralise good companies”, a warning that was later cited by the Guardian newspaper.

== Promotion of coding and productivity ==
A self taught software coder herself, Zilinskiene advocates the importance of learning to code and the crucial role that software plays in improving business productivity and the lives of people. In an interview with Bloomberg in 2020, she explained her optimism about how tech will help the UK flourish in the 4th Industrial Revolution saying, “Now we can see what technology can do for us, people are really pushing forward”. Following her appointment as an ambassador for the Be the Business movement, she was quoted as saying, "Being productive in business is the key to boosting revenue. Be the Business provides leaders with core skills that work and I encourage everyone to join the movement and sign-up for mentoring”.

Investment into the development of people is also close to Zilinskiene's heart and a video interview for the Be the Business movement in 2020, she told of how during the pandemic, she had decided to forfeit office leases and use what she described as dead money paid in commercial rents and invest this into Harvard Business School and other professional training for her employees.

She is also a champion for female entrepreneurship and calling for women across the globe to be more proactive a united to drive productivity, innovation and international trade. In 2014, she has called for the UK to establish a Women's Chamber of Commerce mirroring the model that she has seen with the Greater Houston Chamber of Commerce in the USA. Speaking at Chatham House in July 2019, she contended that females in leadership roles had not progressed since the Second World War and research was not resulting in action.

In 2021, Sheffield Hallam University, appointed Zilinskiene as their Entrepreneur in Residence where she provides advice, insights and mentoring via the Department of Computing and Sheffield Business School.

On 17 February 2021, ICAEW published an interview with Zilinskiene about measuring employee productivity at home during the COVID-19 pandemic. In this she described how before the pandemic, Guildhawk started towards remote work. She explained that Guildhawk technology was used to focus was on the output of its employees, “not to police them, but rather to understand the impact of how they work”. She also cited her online CEO briefings and constant dialogue between employees and their managers as effective tactics to improve efficiency and communication during lockdown. She said these initiatives enabled the company to record an 18% increase in overall productivity since staff started remote work.

In 2025, Innovate UK named Guildhawk Gai Labs and Sheffield Hallam as one of 50 of the most successful technology innovation partnerships in UK history for their work on two Knowledge Transfer Partnerships that included creation of Gai Translate .

== Charity ==
In September 2012, Zilinskiene co-hosted the Courage and Benevolence Ball alongside the English actor, Sir Timothy Ackroyd at Café de Paris in London. The event was sponsored by Guildhawk and raised money towards Epidermolysis Bullosa research and treatment for the charity, DebRA. The Jazz Age music and Art Deco theme appeared again on 15 January 2020, when Jurga partnered with British Bandleader Alex Mendham & His Orchestra and auctioned a prize billed as an unforgettable experience with the orchestra at the prestigious Lansdowne Club.

== Personal life ==
Zilinskiene is married to David Clarke, a former Chief Superintendent at City of London Police and founder of the National Fraud Intelligence Bureau who became a director of Guildhawk in 2013.

In a 2019 interview with the Business Desk she named Whitby as her favourite place to visit in Yorkshire and stated that tailoring magnate Sir Montague Burton, who was born in her native Kaunas had a great influence on her and her ethical approach to business. She added that her affection for the county was enhanced by the fact that her husband David was born in Doncaster, they were married at Oulton Hall in Yorkshire, her daughter is studying for her PhD in Material Science at the University of Sheffield, and she admires the plain speaking nature of Yorkshire people.

== Awards ==
- Shell LiveWIRE Award for Young Entrepreneurs in 2003.
- UK Trade & Investment Certificate of Appreciation, presented by Prince Philip, Duke of Edinburgh.
- Named as one of '100 Lithuanian Women' that Lithuania is proud of in 2018.
- Order of the British Empire from Queen Elizabeth II in the 2019 Birthday Honours.

== Television appearances ==
Matt Cooke, reporter for BBC London News interviewed Zilinskiene in June 2011 regarding her involvement in the Ready to Supply programme run by the City of London Corporation; a scheme aimed at spreading wealth and employment beyond the square mile through practical advice and business support to SMEs who are looking to procure from large organisations.

In October 2009, Zilinskiene was interviewed by STV about the initiative launched by Guildhawk to recruit Glaswegian interpreters. The Glaswegian interpreter campaign was similar to the recruitment of Geordie, Scouse and Brooklynese interpreters. However, this was met with some trepidation and controversy around the need to translate local dialects.

In November 2016, Zilinskiene's company advertised for ‘the world’s first emoji translator’, which received widespread media coverage. As a result of the unusual job advertisement, Zilinskiene appeared on BBC, ITV News, and Vice, as well as several radio stations.
