= Broken Record =

Broken record commonly refers to a skipping record, or to a person who, similarly, keeps repeating the same thing.

Broken Record may also refer to:

== Music ==
- Broken Records (band), an indie folk band from Edinburgh, Scotland
- Broken Records (record label), a Christian record label

=== Albums ===
- Broken Record (album), a 2010 album by Lloyd Cole
- Broken Record, a 2019 album by gospel singer Travis Greene
- Broken Record (EP), a 2013 EP by Jayme Dee

=== Songs ===
- "Broken Record" (Katy B song), a 2011 song by Katy B from the album On a Mission
- "Broken Record" (Little Boots song), 2013
- "Broken Record", a 2017 song by Hollywood Undead from the album Five
- "Broken Record", a 2017 song by Alex Mendham & His Orchestra from the album On With The Show
- "Broken Record", a 2012 song by Call Me No One from the album Last Parade
- "Broken Record", a 2011 song by Corey Smith
- "Broken Record", the title song by Jayme Dee from the aforementioned EP of the same name
- "Broken Record", a 2010 song by Plain White T's from the album Wonders of the Younger
- "Broken Record", a 1998 song by The Posies from album Alive Before the Iceberg
- "Broken Record", a 2014 song by Shakira from the album Shakira
- "Broken Record", a song by Van Morrison from Versatile 2017
- "Broken Records", a song by Eric Burdon from the album My Secret Life

== Other uses ==
- Broken record (assertiveness), a technique of Systematic Assertiveness Therapy
- A world record (or other similar record) that has been surpassed
- Broken Record, the autobiography of Roy Campbell, 1934
- Broken Record (film), a 2014 British film
- Broken Record Podcast by Rick Rubin
- "Broken Records", an episode of the series Ruby Gloom
