= On with the Show =

On with the Show may refer to:

== Film ==
- On with the Show (1921 film), an American film of 1921
- On with the Show!, a 1929 American musical film

== Music ==
- On with the Show (Sherbet album)
- On with the Show (Alex Mendham and His Orchestra album)
- "On with the Show", a song by The Rolling Stones from Their Satanic Majesties Request
- "On with the Show", a song by Mötley Crüe from Too Fast for Love
- On with the Show (concert tour), a 2014–15 tour by Fleetwood Mac

== See also ==
- "On wit da Show", a 1997 song by Kardinal Offishall
