= Chez Paree =

Nightclub in Chicago, Illinois, US

- Interactive map of Chez Paree
- Address: 610 N. Fairbanks Court
- Location: Chicago, Illinois
- Coordinates: 41.8932°N 87.6204°W
- Type: Nightclub

Construction
- Opened: 1932
- Closed: 1960
- Architect: Marshall and Fox

The Chez Paree was a Chicago nightclub known for its glamorous atmosphere, elaborate dance numbers, and top entertainers. It operated from 1932 until 1960 in the Streeterville neighborhood of Chicago at 610 N. Fairbanks Court. The club hosted a wide variety of performers, from singers to comedians to vaudeville acts. A "new" Chez Paree opened briefly in the mid-1960s on 400 N. Wabash Avenue and was seen in the film Mickey One with Warren Beatty.

== History ==
The Chez Paree was initially opened in 1932 by Mike Fritzel and Joe Jacobson. After reported financial problems operating the club, it was sold to a group of partners in 1949; Jack Schatz, Don Jo Medlevine, Al Kaiser, and Dave Halper.

Chez Paree was housed on the third floor of a loft building designed in 1917 by the architects Marshall and Fox, who also designed the Drake Hotel and the Blackstone Hotel. During the Chez Paree's early years, the building's second floor was home of the School of Design, which was started by László Moholy-Nagy, the former director of the New Bauhaus School in Chicago.

From 1951 until the Venue's closing it was the remote location for The Jack Eigen Show on WMAQ.

== Current use ==
The address is now home to Chez, a contemporary event space named in homage to the Chez Paree, and the Internet-based apartment listing service Domu.

== Notable performers ==
Artists who performed at Chez Paree included:

=== Musicians ===
- The Ames Brothers
- The Andrews Sisters
- Louis Armstrong
- Gus Arnheim
- Pearl Bailey
- Belle Baker
- Count Basie
- Polly Bergen
- Tony Bennett
- Ben Bernie
- Connee Boswell
- Bobby Breen
- Teresa Brewer
- Carol Bruce
- Joyce Bryant
- Henry Busse
- Cab Calloway
- Kitty Carlisle
- Rosemary Clooney
- Nat King Cole
- Dorothy Collins
- Xavier Cugat
- Vic Damone
- Dorothy Dandridge
- Billy Daniels
- Bobby Darin
- Jean Darling
- Sammy Davis Jr.
- Jimmy Dorsey
- Tommy Dorsey
- Morton Downey
- Billy Eckstine
- Duke Ellington
- Dale Evans
- Frances Faye
- Benny Fields and Blossom Seeley
- Gracie Fields
- Ella Fitzgerald
- Connie Francis
- Jane Froman
- Judy Garland
- Benny Goodman
- Eydie Gormé
- Dolores Gray
- Mitzi Green
- Joel Grey
- Connie Haines
- Phil Harris
- Woody Herman
- Al Hibbler
- Hildegarde
- Billie Holiday
- Libby Holman
- Lena Horne
- Betty Hutton
- Ina Ray Hutton
- Mahalia Jackson
- Harry James
- Allan Jones
- Kitty Kallen
- Eartha Kitt
- Gene Krupa
- Frankie Laine
- Abbe Lane
- Frances Langford
- Steve Lawrence
- Peggy Lee
- Liberace
- George Liberace
- Abbey Lincoln
- Jerry Lee Lewis
- Ted Lewis
- Ella Logan
- Julie London
- Abe Lyman
- Vincent Lopez
- Abe Lyman
- June MacCloy
- Gordon MacRae
- Rose Marie
- Peter Marshall
- Dean Martin
- Tony Martin
- Johnny Mathis
- The McGuire Sisters
- Ethel Merman
- Borrah Minnevitch
- Carmen Miranda
- Helen Morgan
- Gertrude Niesen
- Helen O'Connell
- Marguerite Piazza
- Jane Powell
- Louis Prima
- Tito Puente
- Johnnie Ray
- Della Reese
- Phil Regan
- Harry Richman
- Beverly Roberts
- Charles 'Buddy' Rogers
- Lillian Roth
- Connie Russell
- Jean Sablon
- Hazel Scott
- Artie Shaw
- Wini Shaw
- Roberta Sherwood
- Ginny Simms
- Nina Simone
- Frank Sinatra
- Keely Smith
- Ann Sothern
- Billy Strayhorn
- Yma Sumac
- Jack Teagarden
- Charlie LaVere
- Kay Thompson and The Williams Brothers
- Mel Tormé
- Helen Traubel
- Sophie Tucker
- Rudy Vallee
- Gus Van
- Sarah Vaughan
- Fran Warren
- Dinah Washington
- Paul Whiteman

=== Comedians ===
- Allen & Rossi
- Morey Amsterdam
- Dave Barry
- Milton Berle
- Joey Bishop
- Ben Blue and Ben Lessy
- Wally Brown and Alan Carney
- Red Buttons
- Sid Caesar
- Candy Candido
- Jack Carter
- Imogene Coca
- Myron Cohen
- Jimmy Durante
- Joey Faye
- Totie Fields
- Paul Gilbert
- Jack Gilford
- Jackie Gleason
- Shecky Greene
- Buddy Hackett
- Peter Lind Hayes
- Lou Holtz
- Bob Hope
- George Jessel
- Will Jordan
- Danny Kaye
- Alan King
- Jack E. Leonard
- Buddy Lester
- Sam Levenson
- Jerry Lewis
- Joe E. Lewis
- Martin & Lewis
- Moms Mabley
- Lou Monte
- Gary Morton
- Zero Mostel
- Jan Murray
- Tommy Noonan
- Olsen and Johnson
- Martha Raye
- The Ritz Brothers
- Rowan & Martin
- Benny Rubin
- Jimmy Savo
- Herb Shriner
- Red Skelton
- Larry Storch
- Danny Thomas
- Mae West
- Bert Wheeler
- Yacht Club Boys
- Henny Youngman

=== Dancers and other celebrities ===
- Carmen Amaya
- Bill Baird's Marionettes
- Edgar Bergen
- Ray Bolger
- John Boles
- Louise Brooks
- Lynne Carter
- Cyd Charisse
- Jack Cole
- Carmen De Lavallade
- The DeMarcos
- Paul Draper
- Katherine Dunham
- Bob Fosse
- The Four Step Brothers
- Zsa Zsa Gabor
- Tess Gardella
- Lita Grey
- Harriet Hoctor
- Geoffrey Holder
- Betty and Jane Kean
- Peter Lawford
- Gypsy Rose Lee
- Jeni Le Gon
- Hal Le Roy
- Marie McDonald
- Butterfly McQueen
- Ann Miller
- The Nicholas Brothers
- Ann Pennington
- Eleanor Powell
- June Preisser
- Sally Rand
- Bill Robinson
- Mickey Rooney
- Janice Rule
- Peggy Ryan
- Ethel Shutta
- June Taylor
- Lupe Vélez
- Gwen Verdon
- Señor Wences
- Veloz and Yolanda
- Janet Todd

== In popular culture ==
- The movie The Bridges at Toko-Ri included a scene where William Holden is listening to an Armed Forces Radio Service broadcast of Henry Busse music from "the Chez Paree in Chicago overlooking Lake Michigan".
