= A Love-tale of Alsace Lorraine =

"A Love-Tale of Alsace Lorraine"

Song
- Published: 1928
- Released: 1928
- Label: Spier and Coslow
- Composers: J. Fred Coots, Lou Davis
- Lyricists: J. Fred Coots, Lou Davis

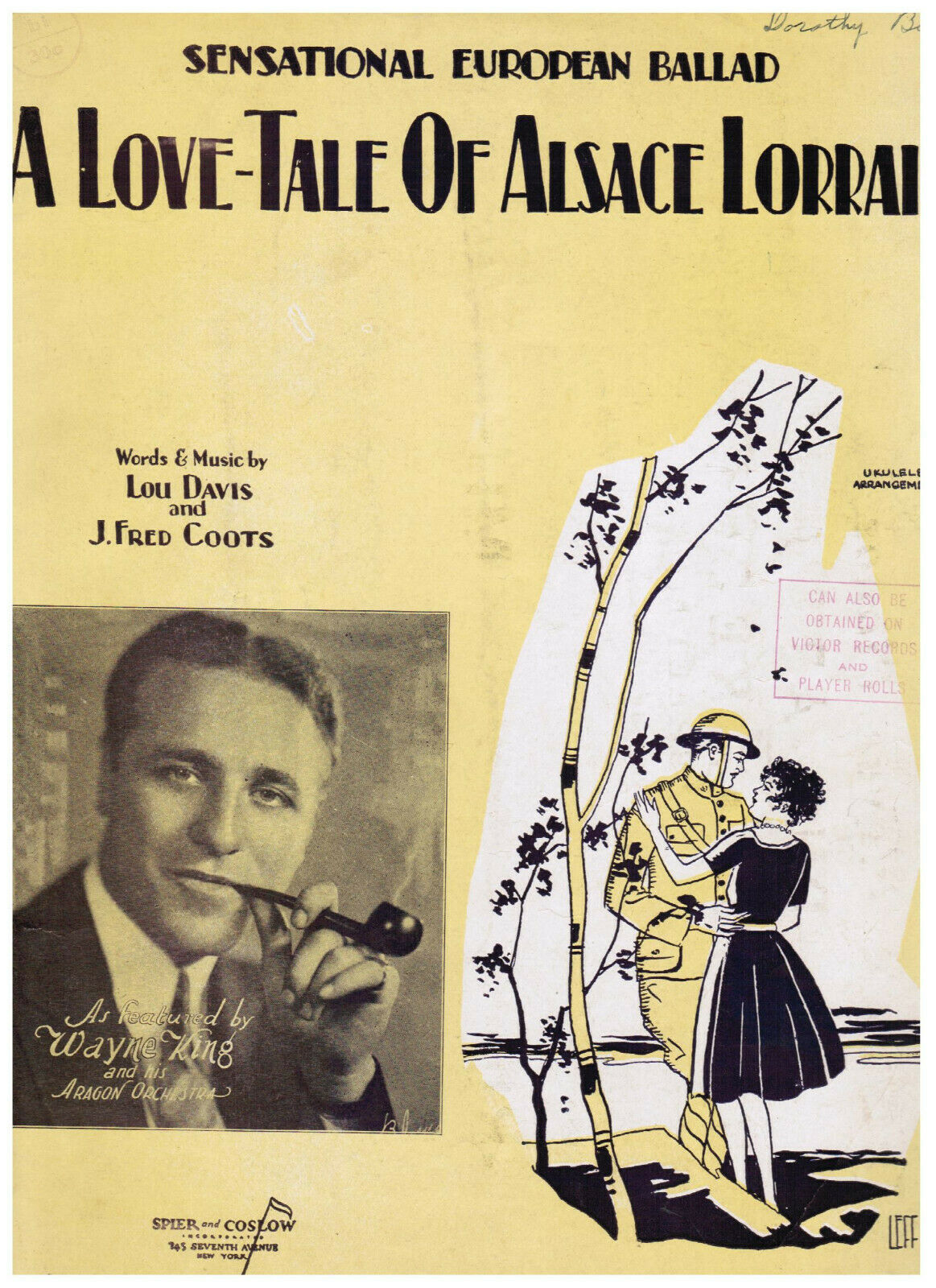
A Love-Tale of Alsace Lorraine

"A Love-Tale of Alsace Lorraine" is a song published in 1928 by Spier and Coslow of New York City.

It is a foxtrot, and is about a French girl who falls in love with an American soldier who dies in battle in World War I.

The song was written for voice, piano, and ukulele. J. Fred Coots and Lou Davis were credited as the composers and lyricists.

Artist Sydney Leff (1901-2005) designed the cover art.

On February 25, 1929, a version of the song was released by Victor Records. It was performed by Melody Three, a male vocal trio which included Frank Luther. In 1929, it was recorded by Smith Ballew. It was also recorded by Wayne King and His Aragon Orchestra (photo), and by Fred Waring and His Pennsylvanians.
