= WSCR (AM) =

Clear-channel sports radio station in Chicago

- Chicago, Illinois; United States
- Broadcast area: Chicago metropolitan area
- Frequency: 670 kHz
- Branding: 104-3 The Score

Programming
- Format: Sports radio
- Affiliations: BetMGM Network; Chicago Bulls; Chicago Cubs; DePaul Blue Demons; Illinois Fighting Illini; Westwood One Sports

Ownership
- Owner: Audacy, Inc.; (Audacy License, LLC)
- Sister stations: WBBM; WBBM-FM; WCFS-FM; WSCR-FM; WUSN; WXRT

History
- First air date: April 12, 1922
- Former call signs: WGU (1922); WMAQ (1922–2000)
- Call sign meaning: Sports score

Technical information
- Licensing authority: FCC
- Facility ID: 25445
- Class: A
- Power: 50,000 watts (unlimited)
- Transmitter coordinates: 41°56′3.11″N 88°4′22.25″W (main); (auxiliary) 41°56′18.1″N 87°45′5.2″W (auxiliary)
- Repeater: 104.3 WSCR-FM (Chicago)

Links
- Public license information: Public file; LMS
- Webcast: Listen live (via Audacy)
- Website: www.audacy.com/thescorechicago

WSCR (670 kHz) – branded 104-3 The Score – is a commercial AM sports radio station, licensed to Chicago, Illinois, which serves the Chicago metropolitan area. Owned by Audacy, Inc., WSCR is a clear-channel station, one of five in the Chicago market along with WGN, WMVP, WLS and co-owned WBBM. Studios are located at Two Prudential Plaza in the Chicago Loop, while its transmitter is in suburban Bloomingdale, diplexed with WBBM. Besides its main analog transmission, WSCR is simulcast on 104.3 WSCR-FM, and streams online via Audacy.

WSCR operates at 50,000 watts around the clock. Due to its low frequency, high power, and Illinois's flat land (with superior ground conductivity), it has an unusually large daytime coverage area, equivalent to that of a full-power FM station. It provides at least secondary coverage to three-fourths of Illinois, almost half of Indiana, much of southeastern Wisconsin, most of West Michigan, and a sliver of eastern Iowa. At night, its extended nighttime range allows it to be heard in much of the eastern half of North America with a good radio, though it is strongest in the Central United States.

== Programming ==
This is the third station in the Chicago market to hold the WSCR call sign and "Score" branding, adopting in 2000 a format that originated in 1992 on 820 AM, and was heard on 1160 AM from 1997 to 2000.

WSCR is the Chicago affiliate for the BetMGM Network, Westwood One Sports, the Fighting Illini Sports Network and the NFL on Westwood One Sports; the flagship station for the Chicago Cubs and Chicago Bulls radio networks; and the home of radio personalities David Haugh and Matt Spiegel. It is the exclusive Chicago radio outlet for DePaul Blue Demons men's basketball, Chicago Cubs baseball, and Chicago Bulls basketball. WSCR also carries other live sports programming from Westwood One Sports.

The Score's long-time listeners, callers, and e-mailers are known as "Score Heads", and often use colorful monikers. The station has also done remote broadcasts from various locations.

Beginning in 2005, WSCR aired Sporting News Radio programming overnights. Currently overnight, Westwood One Sports programming is heard on AM 670. WSCR also carries Westwood One Sports on its Audacy live stream audio whenever it airs the NFL on Westwood One.

== History ==
=== 1920s ===
Effective December 1, 1921, the Department of Commerce, which regulated radio at this time, adopted a regulation creating a broadcasting station category, authorizing operation on the "entertainment" wavelength of 360 meters (833 kHz) and the "market and weather" wavelength of 485 meters (619 kHz).

The first two broadcasting stations located in Chicago were Westinghouse's KYW, licensed on November 9, 1921, which moved to Philadelphia in 1934, and WBU, first licensed on February 21, 1922, by the City of Chicago, which was deleted on November 7, 1923. Therefore, although the third station licensed, WSCR is the oldest surviving Chicago radio station.

Just weeks before the station's inaugural broadcast, Walter A. Strong, business manager of the Daily News, realized the station would need a manager. Strong knew a young woman, Judith C. Waller, with some ad agency experience. He called her and said, "I've just bought a radio station; come down and run it." Waller protested that she did not know anything about running a station. Strong replied "neither do I, but come down and we'll find out". Waller was hired in February 1922. She went on to have a long and distinguished career in broadcasting. Waller remained in charge of the station until it was purchased by the National Broadcasting Company (NBC). At that point, she became the director of public affairs programming for NBC's central division, holding that title until her retirement in 1957.

WSCR was first licensed on March 29, 1922, as WGU, with 100 watts on 360 meters, to The Fair Department Store in Chicago. The call letters were randomly assigned. A joint venture between The Fair and the Chicago Daily News, WGU's first transmitter was located atop the department store. WGU made its debut broadcast on April 12. There are questions whether anyone heard this initial half-hour broadcast, as technical problems forced WGU to shut down beginning the next day, while waiting for a replacement transmitter. Other limitations included interference from the tall buildings in the surrounding area, and the station's low power.

WGU was briefly deleted on September 29, 1922, then relicensed three days later as WMAQ, jointly to The Fair Corporation and the Chicago Daily News, still on 360 meters. The new call letters were randomly assigned from a sequential roster of available call signs. The WMAQ call letters were first heard on October 2, 1922, with the inaugural show featuring comedian Ed Wynn. The station's longtime motto "We Must Answer Questions", was derived from this call sign.

WMAQ broadcast towers atop La Salle Hotel, where the studios were also located – 1925.

By early 1923, there were 20 radio stations in Chicago-area alone. Most of the smaller stations were eventually shut down, because of financing issues. Stations that survived for many years usually had a store, newspaper or organization behind them, which was willing to weather the early times when radio stations did not make a profit. WMAQ had the financial backing of the Chicago Daily News and a very capable general manager in Judith Waller.

At first all stations in a given region shared time on the single entertainment wavelength of 360 meters. In September 1922, the Department of Commerce set aside a second entertainment wavelength, 400 meters (750 kHz) for "Class B" stations that had quality equipment and programming. In May 1923, additional "Class B" frequencies were made available, with Chicago assigned the use of 670 kHz, and WMAQ was assigned, initially exclusively, to this new frequency. With a new location and new frequency of 670 kHz, WMAQ went on the air July 2, 1923, although it later had to share this frequency with another local station, WQJ, which was jointly owned by the Calumet Baking Powder Company and the Rainbo Gardens Ballroom on North Clark Street. Rainbo was one of the country's top ballrooms and Calumet's broadcasts brought the company much publicity for its products.

By early 1923, the Daily News bought out the Fair Store's 51% interest in WMAQ. The News moved the station and its transmitter to the tallest building in Chicago at the time—the La Salle Hotel on West Washington street in the West Loop. In late 1923, WMAQ's power was increased to 500 watts.

Within four weeks after its move, WMAQ obtained the exclusive Chicago rights from American Telephone & Telegraph to broadcast President Warren Harding's address from San Francisco. It also had the rights for his memorial services on August 10, 1923. At the time, it was AT&T's policy to sell the exclusive broadcasting rights for an event to one radio station per city. Shortly before the special event, AT&T would send telegrams to all radio stations, informing them of what event was to take place. The first radio station to respond was then granted the exclusive broadcast rights in that city. WMAQ later broadcast both the 1924 Republican and Democratic conventions by this same arrangement.

By 1924, the station began broadcasting sporting events, airing the 1924 World Series and convincing William Wrigley to carry all Chicago Cubs home games from Wrigley Field in 1925, the first time one station aired an entire season of Cubs games. Hal Totten, a Daily News sportswriter, was WMAQ's first sportscaster. Beginning in the fall of 1925, college football games from the University of Chicago were also broadcast. WMAQ was the first to carry an intercollegiate football game in the United States.

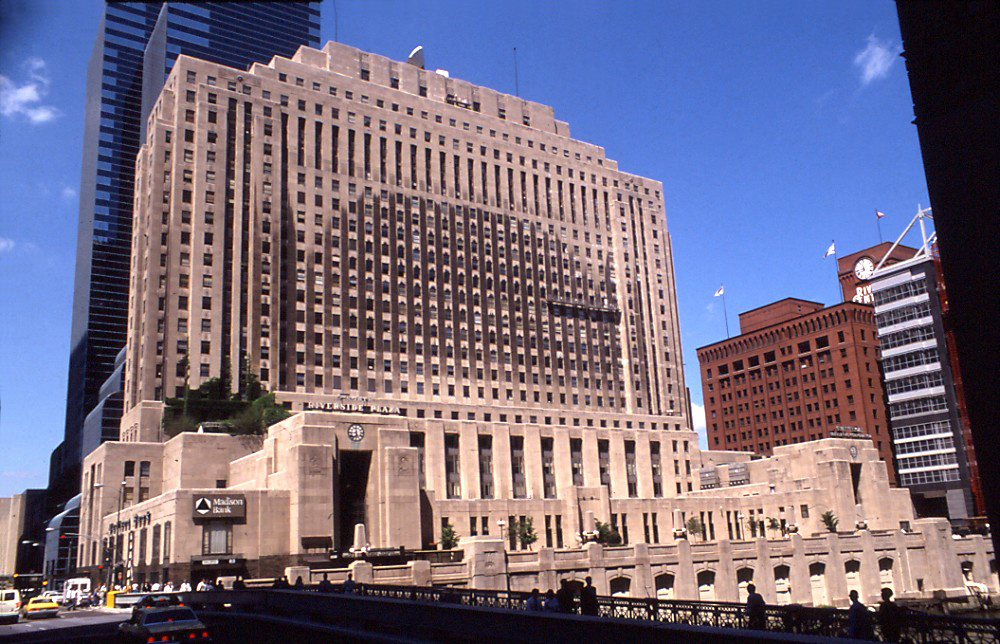
The former home of WMAQ and the Chicago Daily News

WMAQ became a network affiliate of the NBC Red Network in January 1927. In September 1927, it severed its ties with NBC and joined the new Columbia Broadcasting System (CBS) as a charter affiliate. It was one of the 16 stations that aired the first CBS network program on September 18, 1927. The Daily News bought out WMAQ's timesharing partner, WQJ, in 1927 which made the 670 frequency exclusively available for WMAQ.

Wanting to expand its coverage area, WMAQ needed a new stronger transmitter. A site was purchased outside of the city, and in 1928, the new transmitter was constructed in Elmhurst. It was also time to move the studios from the La Salle Hotel. Walter Strong, who by then had become the publisher of the Daily News, had just finished construction of new building for his newspaper that included studio space for WMAQ. By September 1929, the station had moved to Daily News Building at 400 West Madison (today 2 North Riverside Plaza). In April 1930, WMAQ was organized as a subsidiary corporation with Walter Strong as its chairman of the board, and Judith Waller as vice president and station manager.

A new radio show called Amos 'n' Andy aired for the first time on WMAQ on March 19, 1928. The actors were no strangers to Chicago radio as their program originally aired on WGN as Sam 'n' Henry. Their first appearance on Chicago radio is said to have been on WLS in the late 1920s. Charles Correll and Freeman Gosden broke with WGN over syndication rights. General manager Judith Waller saw the potential of the radio show and granted these rights to the duo as part of their WMAQ contract. Because WGN owned the rights to the characters Sam and Henry, Gosden and Correll made some revisions to their act and renamed the characters for their new program Amos and Andy. Since WMAQ was affiliated with CBS at the time, Waller tried to convince the network to make Amos 'n' Andy a network program, but there was no interest. NBC brought the program to its Blue Network in the fall of 1929, paying the duo a record $100,000 for the right to broadcast the program.

=== 1930s ===
By 1930, the Daily News began experimenting with mechanical television broadcasting. A published announcement of March 30, 1930, indicated the equipment would be installed and operable within two months. The video signal was to be sent by the shortwave radio station W9XAP, while the audio would be broadcast on the normal WMAQ radio frequency. WMAQ did not receive an experimental license from the Federal Radio Commission to operate station W9XAP until September 2, 1930. The first broadcast of the station actually occurred shortly before this was granted, on August 27, 1930. Only those with special receivers, primarily radio stores which had gotten them from the Daily News, could see the video portion of the broadcast. The station distributed 200 receivers in the city and suburbs. Those at the dealerships saw and heard Bill Hay, the announcer for Amos 'n' Andy, present a variety show, broadcast from the Daily News Building. The man behind this and other early Chicago television broadcasts was Ulises Armand Sanabria, who 2 years before used the WCFL Navy Pier transmitter to provide the video and radio station WIBO for the audio portions of the broadcast. Both the technical limitations and economic climate of the times brought an end to the station's experimental broadcasts in August 1933. It was the beginning of WMAQ-TV, which would not return until after World War II.

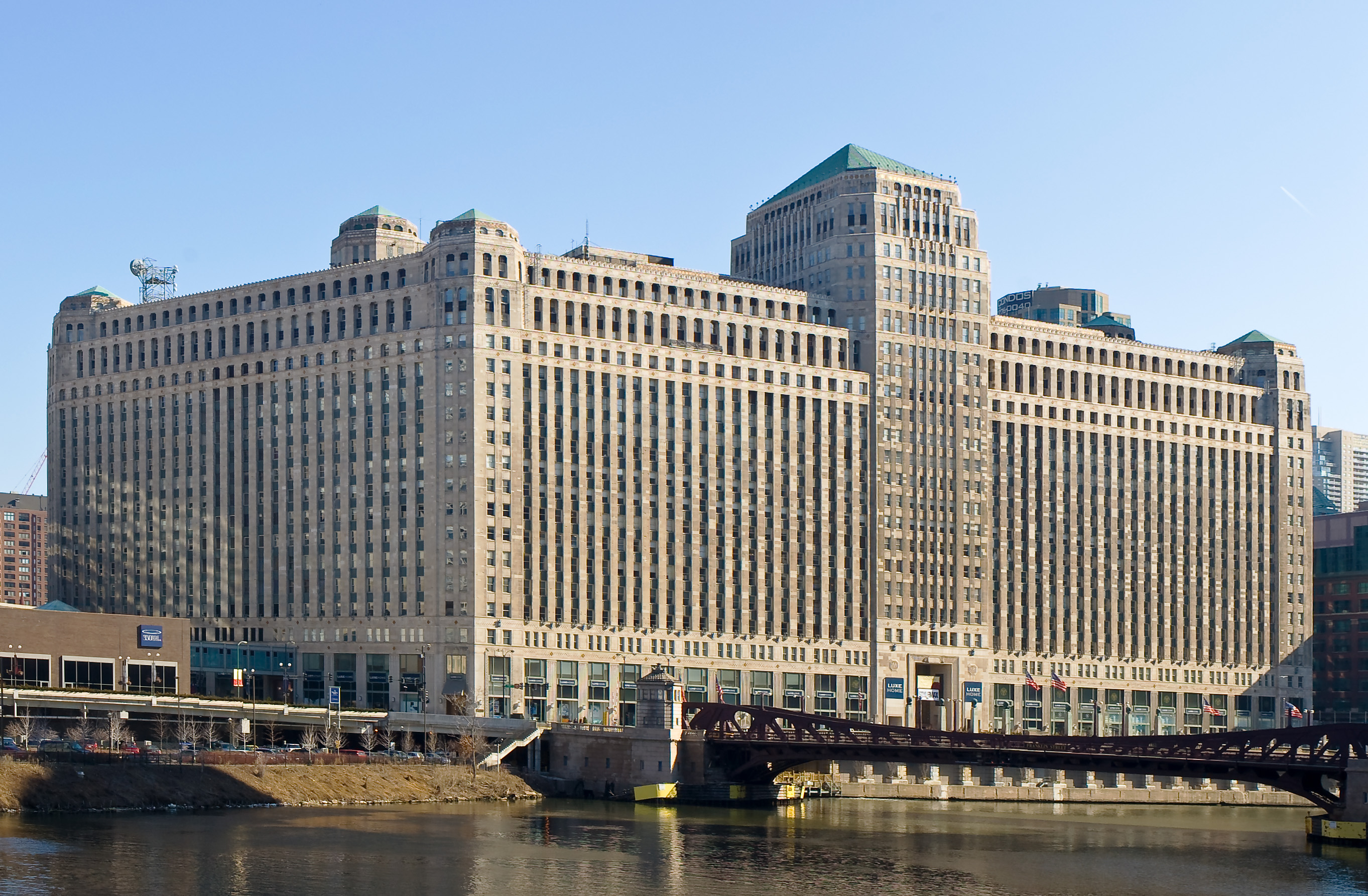
The Merchandise Mart: WMAQ was here for the years it was owned by NBC.

On November 1, 1931, the Daily News sold WMAQ to NBC, and it became a key station in the NBC Radio Network for nearly six decades, and later started affiliates WMAQ-TV (channel 5) and WMAQ-FM (101.1 FM). The arrangement originally began as NBC becoming a partner in the station, co-owned with the Daily News. In May of the next year, NBC moved the station from the Daily News Building to the Merchandise Mart, where it had newly built a broadcasting center in 1930. WMAQ remained there until a 1989 move to the NBC Tower. WMAQ became a member of the NBC Red Network, later known as the NBC Radio Network, and remained affiliated with NBC well into the 1990s, even after the station was sold to Westinghouse Broadcasting.

On September 15, 1935, WMAQ again changed transmitter sites, and relocated to Bloomingdale, with its power increasing from 5,000 watts to the maximum 50,000 watts. As part of the Federal Radio Commission's 1928 implementation of its General Order 40, the Clear channel frequency of 1020 kHz, in use by KYW, was reserved for the mid-Atlantic United States. Preserving its clear channel assignment meant Westinghouse needed to move KYW out of Chicago, so KYW was moved east to Philadelphia in late 1934, leaving an unneeded transmitter building and site behind, which is where WMAQ relocated its transmitter. WMAQ's new daytime signal provided secondary coverage to most of Illinois, including Peoria and Springfield. It also provided a strong signal to much of southern Wisconsin (with Milwaukee getting a city-grade signal) and almost half of Indiana. At night, it reached most of the eastern three-fourths of North America.

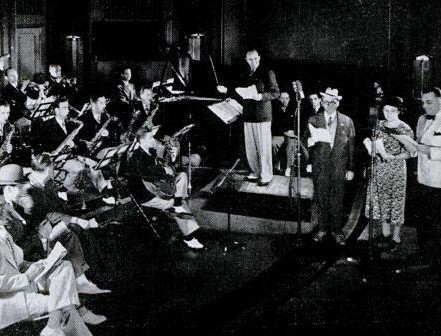
Fibber McGee and Molly from Chicago, 1937

WMAQ carried original local and network programming. Marian and Jim Jordan started at WLS in 1927 with The Smith Family. They came to WMAQ, doing a local show called Smackout and later would move on to form Fibber McGee and Molly. The program was produced at WMAQ from 1935 to 1939, when the show moved to California. During its first months on the air, Fibber McGee and Molly was distributed over NBC's Blue Network, which meant that in Chicago the program was produced at WMAQ but heard over WLS, one of three NBC Blue Network affiliates in Chicago at the time. Amos 'n' Andy was also a popular program that continued being broadcast from Chicago until 1938, when the program moved to Hollywood. Both of these shows moved production to the new NBC West Coast Radio City.

Edgar Bergen was initially turned down for a radio spot at WMAQ. The station manager felt ventriloquism would not work on radio. That turned out to be a mistake. Bergen received an offer from Rudy Vallee to become a part of his radio show in late 1936. By May 1937, Bergen and his puppet Charlie McCarthy had their own show on the NBC Red Network.

Radio from the Merchandise Mart centered around the many studios on the 19th floor. Only one studio, Studio F, was on the 20th. Like its Radio City Rockefeller Center counterpart, there were NBC pages (Bob Sirott was one of them in the late 1960s) and a host of staff announcers. In 1947, Hugh Downs (Today Show and 20/20), Garry Moore (I've Got A Secret) and Durward Kirby (The Garry Moore Show) were on the WMAQ staff, as was Mike Wallace, later of 60 Minutes fame. Dave Garroway (1913–1982) also arrived on the NBC airwaves via WMAQ with his 1160 Club playing big band and jazz music in the 1940s. Garroway was also responsible for organizing a series of local jazz concerts and establishing a Chicago lounge "Jazz Circuit" in 1947 which revived interest in the music genre. In 1948 and 1949, Garroway was voted the nation's top Disk Jockey by his peers in Billboard's annual poll. Garroway would eventually host a number of television shows including the Today Show.

=== 1940s ===
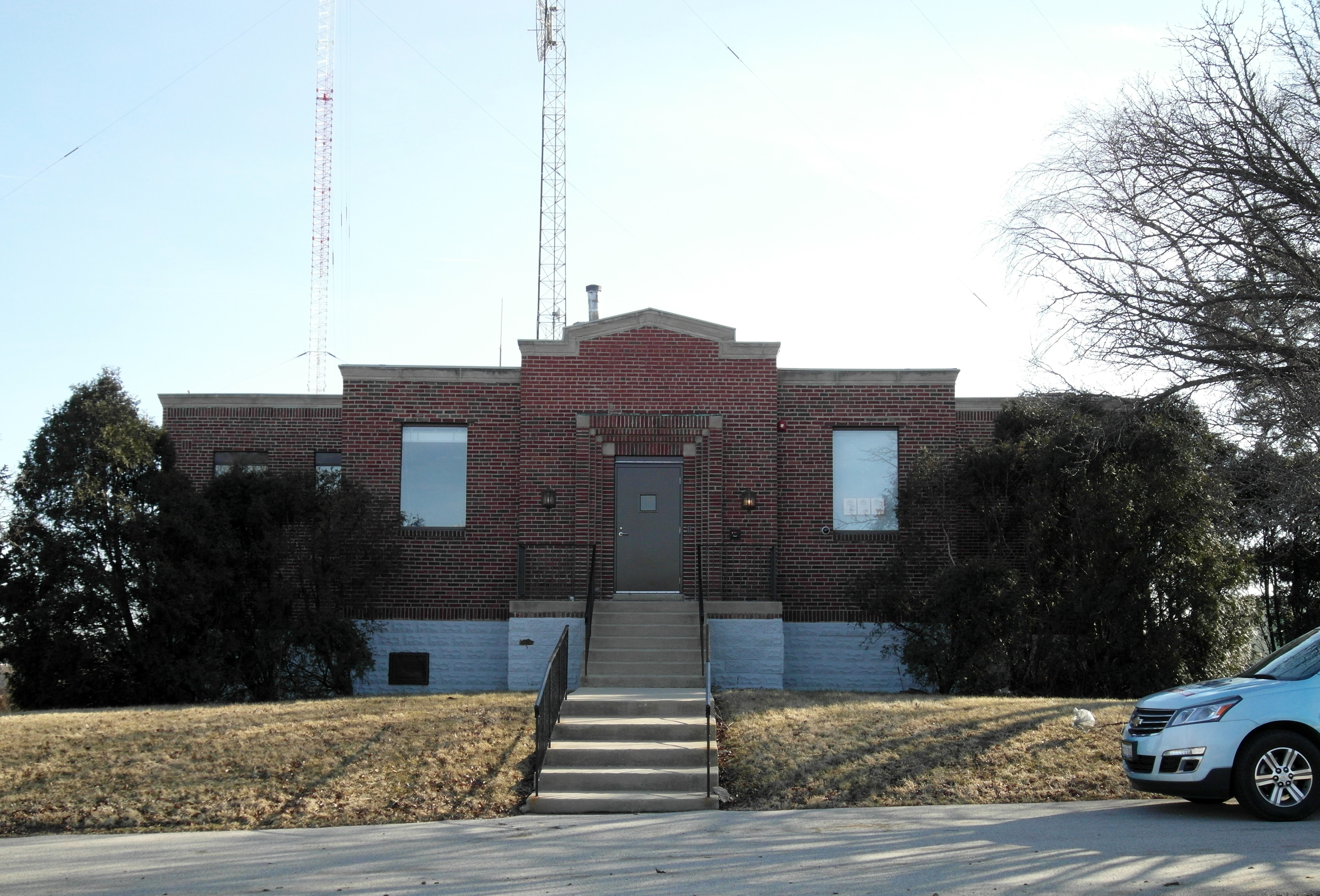
WSCR's transmitter building in Bloomingdale Township

In the 1940s, radio stations like WMAQ began playing recorded music during some hours. For many years due to union constraints, all music broadcast on the network was live. Stations in large cities had to maintain full-time orchestras on their payrolls. The organ music which was a part of many of the radio "soap operas" was provided by union musicians. When turntables entered studio control rooms, the musicians were replaced by the turntable operator or "record turner". It was the job of the turntable operator (a member of the American Federation of Musicians), to play any recorded music. The Musician's Union received jurisdiction over the turntables because it was reasoned that each turntable was responsible for five "live" musicians losing their employment. Not until the late 1960s did the union turntable operator leave the control rooms of NBC Chicago.

For those who had aspirations of becoming broadcasters, WMAQ was a good place to get started in the medium, even if the job was not on the air. The station encouraged its young employees with dreams of working at a microphone by assisting with tuition for college broadcasting courses and holding workshops at the station where those with stars in their eyes were given the chance to display their skills in a "real world" setting. Herb Kent, a Chicago radio pioneer, first came to work in the mailroom at WMAQ as a young high school graduate in the late 1940s. He credits WMAQ and Hugh Downs, who was then a WMAQ staff announcer, with providing him with the tools and encouragement he needed. After getting some announcing experience, Kent returned to WMAQ, this time on the air as a radio actor.

In the mid-1940s, the WMAQ Radio live studios in the Merchandise Mart were converted to TV studios for use by a new television station. Channel 5 signed on the air on October 8, 1948. Its call letters were WNBQ. Those letters combined the initials for National Broadcasting, plus the Q from WMAQ's call sign. That same year, WMAQ also signed on an FM station at 101.1. WMAQ-FM (WKQX) largely simulcast AM 670 for its first two decades on the air. It broadcast with 24,000 watts with its transmitter atop the Civic Opera Building on North Wacker Drive.

The popularity of the radio soap operas which began in Chicago made it necessary for NBC to construct six more radio studios on the 19th floor. WMAQ Radio moved to these smaller studios. Though the NBC Blue Network was sold to American Broadcasting System in 1943, it continued leasing Merchandise Mart space from NBC until its move to the Civic Opera House in 1952. This freed up more space for WMAQ.

The station was a leader in the use of helicopters for traffic reports. In 1948, it used a two-man crew in the air to report traffic on the July 4 weekend. The traffic team covered the Chicago area by air, landing to phone in their reports, which were put on the air.

In 1949, the station suffered what could have been a crippling blow. Its main antenna at the Bloomingdale transmitter site collapsed. WMAQ was able to stay on the air, but not at its normal 50,000–watt power. While the main antenna was out of service, NBC found a solution with some history to it to get WMAQ back broadcasting at full power. RCA had a tower in storage in one of its New Jersey facilities that was used as part of its 1939 New York World's Fair exhibit. The tower, which originally came from NBC-owned WTAM in Cleveland, was shipped to Chicago and became the acting main antenna. It remains standing today at Bloomingdale site. The station launched a new main antenna tower at Bloomingdale in 1951, which was considered to be one of the tallest tower structures in the U.S. at the time.

=== 1950s ===
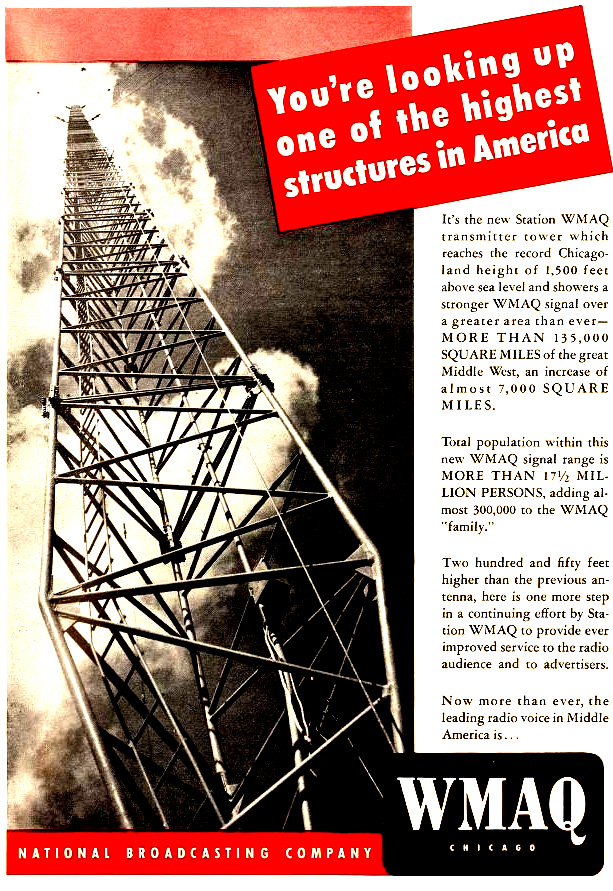
1951 advertisement, as WMAQ.

In 1950, The Chez Show originated from the Chez Paree nightclub on North Fairbanks in Chicago's Streeterville neighborhood. It was one of Chicago's top night spots, as many popular celebrities could be found there, either as performers or as patrons. The original hosts of this weekday late-night interview program were Mike Wallace and his wife, Buff Cobb. In 1951, Jack Eigen (1913–1983) took over as host of the program, a position he held for most of the next 20 years. After the Chez Paree closed in the spring of 1960, the program became The Jack Eigen Show and the interviews continued from WMAQ's Studio G, where there was room enough for a small audience, and from Chicago's Sherman House Hotel. The hotel's College Inn was another popular local venue for entertainment and entertainers.

Beginning in 1956, the overnight hours were the domain of Holmes "Daddy-O" Daylie (1920–2003), who brought his sense of humor, way with words and musical knowledge to WMAQ as he played cool jazz until dawn. "Daddy-O" was the first African-American hosting a regularly scheduled radio show on a Chicago network owned and operated station. It was WMAQ's Dave Garroway who discovered Daddy-O tending bar in 1947 and suggested he train for work in radio. By 1948, Daddy-O was on the air on Chicago's WAIT. When Garroway discovered Daylie, he was the host of the 1160 Club overnight on WMAQ, also playing jazz.

Other performers who would go on to make their mark on local broadcasting got their "break" at WMAQ too. One of them was Ned Locke (1919–1992), who hosted a Saturday children's radio show, Uncle Ned's Flying Squadron, on the station in 1950. His radio work led to his being asked to substitute for the host of a popular weekday children's program on WMAQ-TV. He went on to WGN-TV, where he continued to participate in local children's television. Ned Locke is known best to Chicagoans as "Ringmaster Ned". He assumed that role on the successful and popular Chicago version of Bozo's Circus in 1961.

=== 1960s ===
On May 4, 1964, WMAQ switched from a beautiful music format to a MOR-pop standard format, featuring music by artists such as Andy Williams, Nat King Cole, and Jack Jones. The Jack Eigen Show continued to air late nights. A 1964 campaign asking listeners to vote for Elvis Presley or Chubby Checker was just a publicity stunt, but it was enough to start rumors in the broadcasting and record industries that the station was moving to a Top 40 format.

On August 31, 1964, Channel 5 changed its call letters to WMAQ-TV to match WMAQ radio, as the stations emphasized their common NBC ownership.

When Floyd Brown joined the staff in 1965, his photo wound up on the cover of the RCA Employee magazine next to one of Bill Cosby, who was starring in I Spy on NBC-TV. Floyd was the first African American hired as a network announcer. A radio veteran, having been involved at the start of Gordon McLendon's WYNR, his smooth voice, his upbeat personality, and his ability to discuss everything from Big Bands to Beatles to Chicago Bears, informed and entertained WMAQ listeners when he became a regular program host.

=== 1970s ===
During the early 1970s, WMAQ aired a format blending music, talk, news and sports, using the on-air name "67-Q". Although the station never shifted completely to Top 40, by the early 1970s, WMAQ's playlist had become comparable to today's hot adult contemporary format. One of WMAQ's first sports talk programs was Sound off on Sports, with Pat Sheridan (1920–2005). Many of the on-air personalities during this time period were well known to listeners from previous radio stations. Clark Weber, Jim Stagg (1935–2007), Joel Sebastian, Tom Murphy, and Howard Miller all spent some time working at WMAQ and previously at WCFL. A 1975 format change to country music saw WMAQ taking on WJJD. The entire WMAQ air staff was replaced.

Jim Hill (1929–2005), long-time staff announcer and radio host, moved into the WMAQ-TV announcer's booth where he remained until retiring. The first song played under the new format was "Your Cheatin' Heart" by Hank Williams, Sr. The station's fortunes were helped in no small part by the "WMAQ Is Gonna Make Me Rich!" cash giveaway promotion. The giveaway was eventually used on other NBC-owned radio outlets. WMAQ also served as the flagship station for Chicago White Sox baseball broadcasts throughout the 1970s and 1980s, as well as the Chicago Blackhawks hockey team. This was the era of the "Good Morning Guys", including Pat Cassidy, Lee Sherwood, Bob Tracy, Jerry Taft, and Tim Weigel.

=== 1980s and 1990s ===
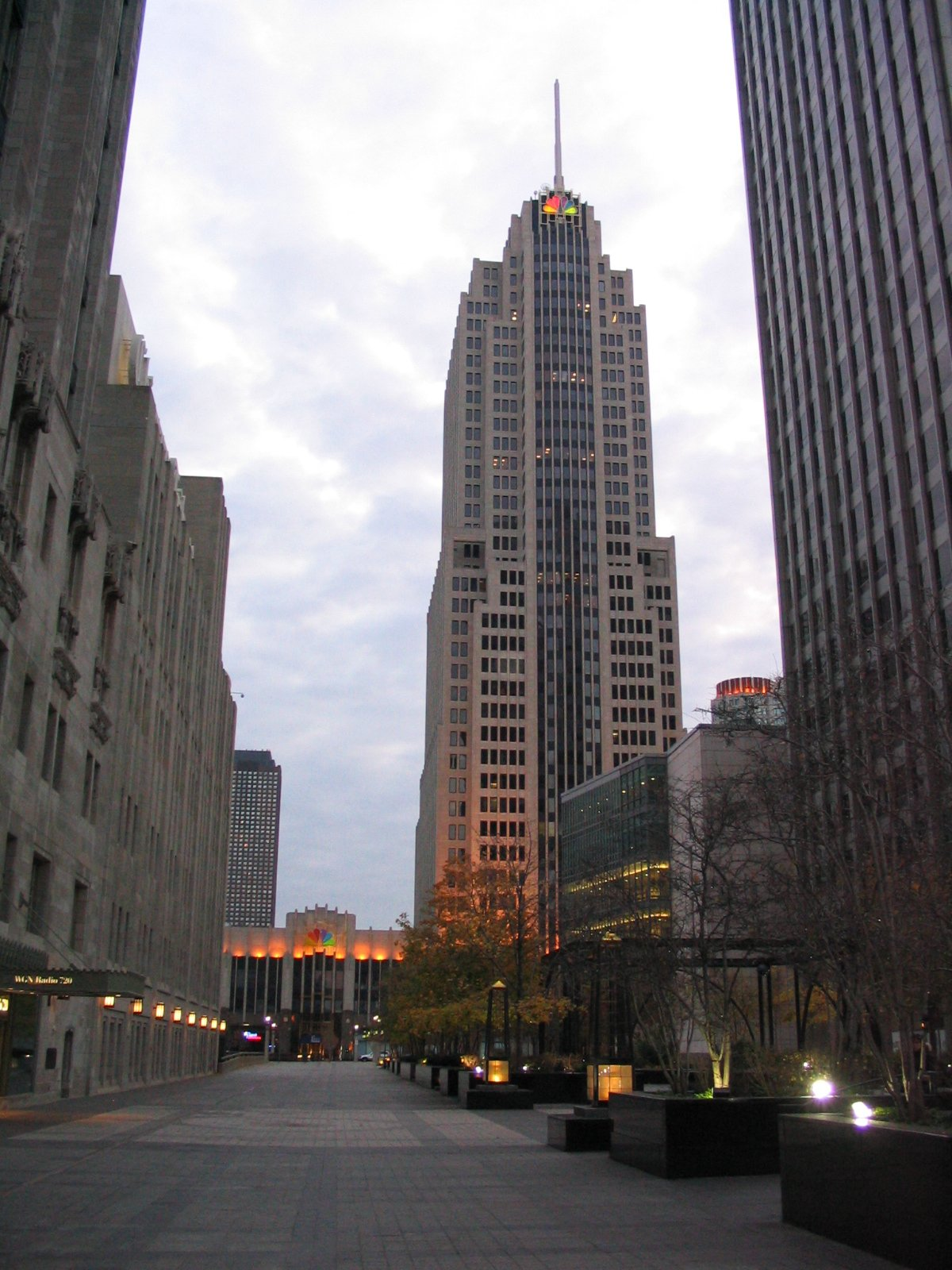
NBC Tower, where WMAQ moved in 1989. WSCR also broadcast here before moving to Two Prudential Plaza.

By early 1986, WMAQ had begun phasing out country music in favor of talk programming, with the station completing its transition on November 17, 1986. Hosts on the station included Morton Downey Jr. and Chet Coppock.

After 57 years, NBC disposed of all of the company's radio stations following RCA's merger with General Electric, with WMAQ being sold to Group W in 1988. This was Westinghouse's third stint at station ownership in the Chicago market, having founded KYW before relocating that station to Philadelphia in 1934, and later with WIND from 1955 to 1985.

At 5 a.m. on March 1, 1988, Group W switched WMAQ to an all-news format, patterned after its successful all-news outlets in New York (WINS), Los Angeles (KFWB) and Philadelphia (KYW). The slogan was the same as those other stations: "You Give Us 22 Minutes, We'll Give You The World". Long-time WMAQ morning news anchor Pat Cassidy (later with WBBM) was on the air when the switch was made to all-news. The news staff included two veteran WMAQ reporters, Bill Cameron and Bob Roberts, holdover anchor Nancy Benson, Jay Congdon, Christopher Michael, Lisa Meyer, Larry Langford (son of the late Chicago Ald. Anna Langford), Dave Berner, Mike Doyle, Jim Gudas, Cisco Cotto, John Dempsey, Chris Robling, Mike Krauser, Corrie Wynns and crime reporter Doug Cummings. Chicago news veteran Jim Frank (formerly of WCFL and WIND) was hired as the news director, following a stint at WIOD in Miami. Other news directors included Bonnie Buck (daughter of sports broadcaster Jack Buck) and Krauser, who took the same position at rival WBBM after Viacom shuttered WMAQ and fired the staff.

WMAQ was among the first Chicago AM stations to transmit using the Motorola C-QUAM AM stereo standard, even though its format was all-news, not music.

The station moved to the new NBC Tower in 1990 with television station WMAQ-TV despite their being owned by different companies. The studios for both stations had been designed by NBC before the sale.

Amid stagnant ratings, WMAQ added more long-form news programming and some assorted call-in shows in 1998 and 1999. Cameron and Langford, hosted by City Hall reporter Bill Cameron and police beat reporter Larry Langford, was cancelled in April 1999, but briefly returned in June 2000. An early harbinger of the future sports format was the evening WMAQ Sports Huddle, which premiered in 1993 and competed with all-sports WSCR and WMVP, as well as WGN's Sports Central program.

Westinghouse merged with CBS in 1995, making WMAQ a sister station to its all-news rival, WBBM; the merger also paired former all-news rival stations in New York and Los Angeles. CBS' radio stations were spun off into Infinity Broadcasting in 1998; CBS retained an 80% stake in the new company.

=== The end of WMAQ and launch of "The Score" ===
Viacom merged with CBS in the spring of 2000, which put the combined company over FCC limits on ownership in Chicago. To consummate the deal, Infinity decided to transfer the format, branding and call letters of WSCR (1160 AM) over to WMAQ, and concentrate exclusively on WBBM's all-news format, while the former WSCR was put up for sale. Despite lower ratings for WSCR, Infinity management wanted to use the move to elevate WSCR's revenue performance to that of their New York City sports outlet WFAN, which had become one of the highest-billing radio stations starting in 1995; a company spokesman also noted that WMAQ's annual billing of $20 million was "not functioning as a successful station" by comparison. While some WMAQ staffers were retained by Infinity and transferred to WBBM, up to 44 reporters, anchors, editors and writers were dismissed; this included Chet Coppock, who frequently sparred on-air with WSCR staff and incumbent morning host Mike North.

On August 1, 2000, after 78 years, WMAQ broadcast for the last time with a live sign-off message from nighttime police beat reporter Larry Langford. The traditional NBC chimes were played with a late 50s-mid 60s historic ID that, although inaccurate with the current network association and sister station, was appropriate as it spoke, "This is NBC, the National Broadcasting Company. WMAQ and WMAQ-FM, NBC in Chicago." An announcer then said the official last words: "The final broadcast, the end of Radio 670, WMAQ, Chicago." After the NBC chimes were played one more time and a WMAQ jingle, the era for the station that was "First In Chicago" came to an end. Following the sign-off, WMAQ ran a loop of "Score" promos for six hours before starting a full simulcast of WSCR for a two-week transitional period.

As part of this exchange, Infinity changed the WMAQ call sign to WSCR on August 15, 2000; changed the station's format to sports radio; and re-branded the station as "670 The Score". All on- and off-air personnel were concurrently transferred to the new WSCR. In effect, the new WSCR (670 AM) licensed to Chicago became the successor to the previous WSCR (1160 AM) licensed to Chicago—which concurrently changed their call sign to WXRT (AM), then was sold that November to Salem Communications, and now operates as WYLL. The "Score" format, branding and call letters had its origins on the former WSCR (820 AM), which launched on January 2, 1992; the second WSCR on the 1160 AM facility debuted on April 17, 1997. All three iterations of WSCR used the same studios at 4949 West Belmont Avenue in Chicago's Cragin neighborhood—shared with WXRT—from 1992 until moving to the NBC Tower in 2001, using the facilities that WMAQ had vacated a year earlier.

=== WSCR ===
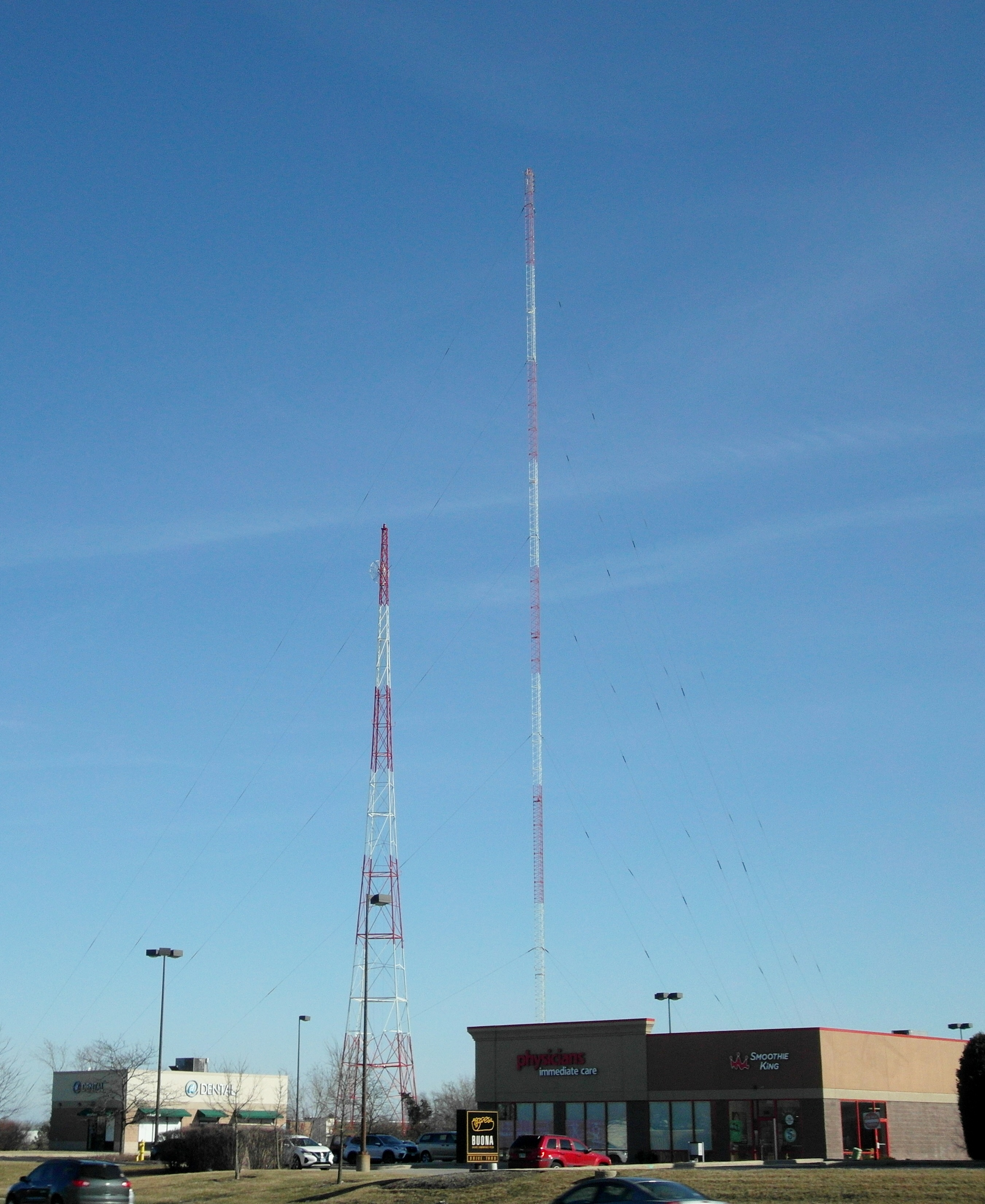
WSCR's main and auxiliary towers in Bloomingdale; former ancient rival and now sister station WBBM moved their transmission to the site in 2019.

Former logo as "670 The Score" used from 2008 to 2026

From 2001 to 2008, the station was the flagship for Chicago Blackhawks hockey, until their move to WGN. WSCR was also the radio home for the Chicago White Sox baseball team from 2006 to 2015, until their departure to WLS at the conclusion of the 2015 season.

Viacom, which had acquired the shares in Infinity Broadcasting it did not already own on February 21, 2001, split into two companies at the end of 2005; Infinity became part of CBS Corporation, and in preparation was renamed CBS Radio on December 14, 2005. In 2010, WSCR's studios were moved to Two Prudential Plaza, home to several other CBS Radio stations.

The Chicago Cubs made WSCR the flagship of their radio network following the White Sox' departure to WLS. When the Cubs left WGN for CBS Radio following the 2014 season, the Cubs were heard on WBBM 780 AM. A clause in the Cubs' deal with CBS allowed a one-time move to WSCR in the event that the White Sox left the station. The move was officially announced on November 11, 2015. The Cubs' first year on WSCR paid immediate dividends, as the team won the 2016 World Series, its first world championship in 108 years, and the first since the birth of radio and modern communications.

On February 2, 2017, CBS Radio announced it would merge with Entercom (the forerunner of present-day Audacy). The merger was approved on November 9, 2017, and was consummated on November 17.

On January 31, 2018, Entercom announced that WSCR would become the new flagship station for the Chicago Bulls on February 3, 2018, after Cumulus Media nullified its contract with the team to carry games on WLS after Cumulus filed for Chapter 11 bankruptcy.

== See also ==
- List of initial AM-band station grants in the United States
