= Pavegen =

UK company

Pavegen Systems
- Founder: Laurence Kemball-Cook
- Key people: Laurence Kemball-Cook (CEO)

Pavegen Systems was a UK technology company that developed interactive floor tiles to convert footsteps into small amounts of electrical energy, data insights, and engagement points for global brands, businesses, and governments. The company was founded in 2009 by Laurence Kemball-Cook.

== History ==
Pavegen Systems is founded in 2009 by Laurence Kemball-Cook. Cook, a graduate in Industrial Technology and Design from Loughborough University, took on a university placement with E.ON, and proposed using footfall as a potential power source.

The development of the first prototype of the Pavegen flooring tile was funded by a Royal Society of Arts International Design Directions prize. The tile that converts kinetic energy from footsteps into electricity, while collecting data about walking traffic patterns.

The first generation tile was made from recycled polymer, with the top surface made from recycled truck tires. Power is generated when a footfall compresses the slab by about 5 mm (0.2 in). The exact technology is a secret, but PaveGen officials have said it involves electromagnetic induction by copper coils and magnets. Pavegen says each pedestrian generates enough to run an LED street lamp for 30 seconds. The technology was developed by Pavegen founder Laurence Kemball-Cook.

An improved tile was developed in 2016, which according to the company improved energy conversion by 'about 20 times'. The amount of energy generated has been criticised, with one calculation claiming that walking for 4 hours on PaveGen paving would generate 0.02% of the average European's energy needs. It has been suggested that the technology's strength rests in its ability to track volume and direction of traffic flow, thus providing useful metrics in a range of scenarios.

Among other installations, the slabs have been laid at London's West Ham Underground station for the 2012 Olympic Games. In April 2013, a demonstration installation with Schneider Electric harvested energy from the runners in the Paris Marathon. PaveGen has also put these tiles on a public soccer field in Rio de Janeiro to allow play after sunset.

A study of a central building at Macquarie University in Sydney, Australia, suggested that if pavers covered the 3.1% of the floor that sees the most foot traffic, it would generate an estimated 1.1 megawatt-hour per year, about 0.5% of the building's energy needs.

In 2012, Pavegen raised £350,000 through London Business Angels, which helped the company create a tangible business. In 2015, the company raised £1.9m through the Crowdcube platform, allowing them to gain 1500 investors and valued the company at about £17m.

In 2015, Kemball-Cook acts as CEO of the company, For his invention, he was chosen as Businessman of the Year at the PEA Awards, and presented with a Shell LiveWIREGrand Ideas Award. He also was named as honorary Enterprise and Innovation Fellow by Loughborough University.

Pavegen went into administration on 30 September 2026.

== Distributors ==
Pavegen manufactured and exported in/from the United Kingdom.

== Real-World Examples ==
An article published by the Institution of Mechanical Engineers shows the image of a display out in public, which is located near a passage way which has been retrofitted with Pavegen's floor tiles. The display outputs the following message: "Your 54,267 steps have brightened up this lane by 217,068 watt seconds".

== Criticism ==
The Register points out in 2015 that this device generates only "tiny, pointless amounts of energy".

== See also ==
- Energy harvesting
- Renewable energy
