= Grabble =

- Initial release: July 1, 2013; 12 years ago
- Operating system: iOS
- Website: grabble.com

Grabble was a fashion and lifestyle mobile commerce platform that currently operates on the iOS platform in the UK. Grabble shut down in 2018.

== History ==
Grabble was originally launched in 2013, by founders Daniel Murray and Joel Freeman, with the idea of curating high street fashion, whereby users could save pieces by “grabbing” them from both the Grabble website and external retail sites using the “Grab” button.

Relaunched in August 2014 as an app for Android and iOS, the app was described as “ASOS meets Pinterest, with sales alerts” and “Tinder for fashion”, due to the swiping system used to like or dislike a product, and a small editorial team was set up to “curate items separately to give the app a more exclusive feel.”

== Features ==
Everything featured on Grabble can be saved to a wish-list and purchased by the user on the app itself. Products can be found through searching brands or categories, however, Grabble encourages the discovery element through curated editorial content.

Editorial content consists of stories covering upcoming designers; trend spotting across fashion, interiors, home ware, beauty tutorials; and lifestyle, such as fitness, food, and travel.

Grabble offers sale alerts, a daily curated New In section and daily themed collections, where users can swipe left or right on products.

Users are able to track their orders and share products or wishlists via email or social media. In 2016, Grabble introduced a rewards scheme for both new and existing users.

== Funding ==
In February 2015, Grabble closed an Angel funding round whose investors included Skimlinks founder Alex Hoye; Guy Hipwell, former Harrods e-commerce director; Alex Tait, former head of e-commerce at Topshop owner Arcadia; and media guru Darren Childs, chief executive of UKTV.

== Reception ==
Since launch, Grabble has gained mostly positive reactions and coverage from various British media outlets:

InStyle Future Fifteen 2016: Daniel Murray

TechCity Insider 100 List (2014)

WIRED Europe’s 100 Hottest Start Ups 2016

== Awards ==
Drapers Digital Awards 2015: Best Tech Start Up

Decoded Fashion Awards 2015: Best Use of Mobile

Everline Future 50 2014 Winner

02 Smarta 100 Award 2014: Mobile Business of the Year

Shell LiveWIRE Young Entrepreneur of the Year 2014 (Awarded to Daniel Murray)
