= Henry Busse =

German jazz trumpeter (1894–1955)

Henry Busse Sr.
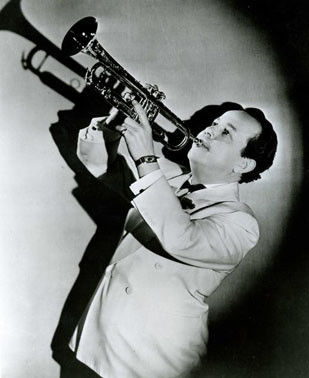
- Henry Busse c. 1943

Background information
- Born: May 19, 1894; Magdeburg, Germany
- Died: April 23, 1955 (aged 60) Memphis, Tennessee
- Genre: Jazz
- Occupation: Musician
- Instrument: Trumpet

Henry Busse Sr. (May 19, 1894 – April 23, 1955) was a German-born jazz trumpeter. A 1948 review in Billboard magazine said that Busse had "a keen sense of musical commercialism".

== Early life ==
Born May 19, 1894, in Magdeburg, Germany, to a generational German Band family, Henry Busse studied violin and then trumpet (after a finger he had broken was set incorrectly) under his Oompah Band leader uncle. In 1912, following numerous failed attempts, at age 18, Busse successfully ran away from the family farm outside of Magdeburg, Germany, where he had been forced to play trumpet in his uncle's band. Henry initially "jumped ship" in New York City, landing in the German ghettos there. Rousted by the police for sleeping in Grand Central Station, unable to speak English, he found a job on a boat heading to California. He acquired some English on his trip. 1916 found Busse in Hollywood working as an extra in Keystone Cop films and playing trumpet in a movie theater pit band.

(The American Big Bands reference book says, "When Henry Busse was a teenager, his family immigrated to the United States from Germany and settled in Ohio.")

== Career ==
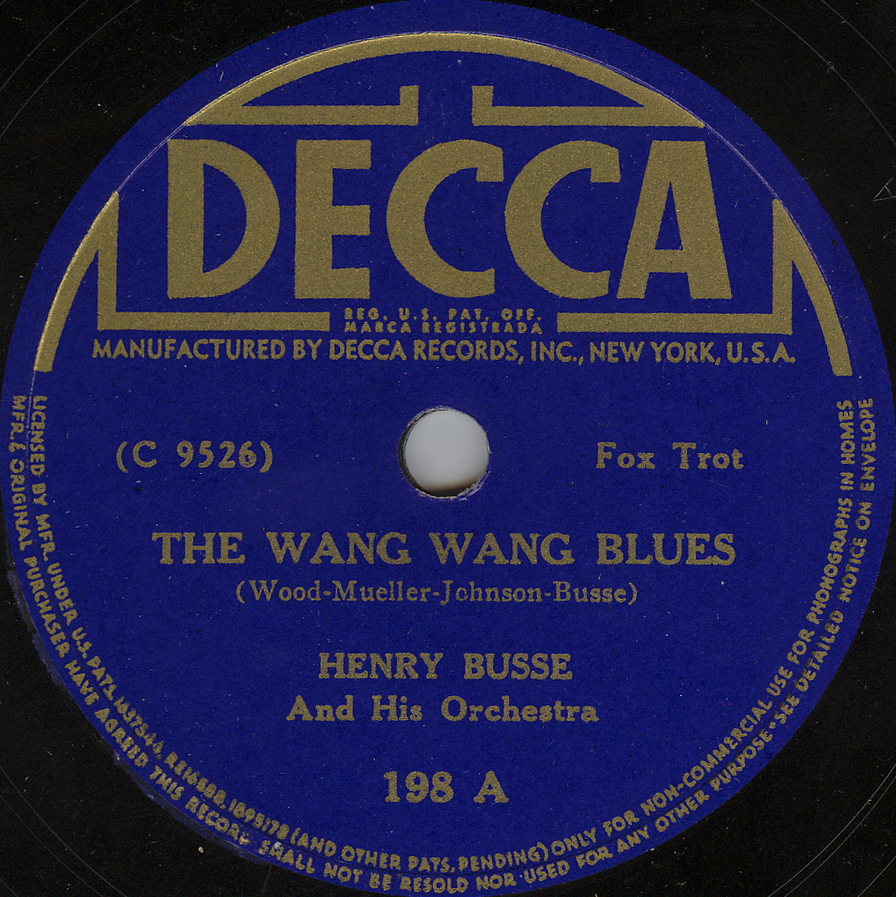
Busse's 1934 re-recording of "Wang Wang Blues", one of his earliest hits with Paul Whiteman in 1920. Busse was co-composer of this tune.

In 1917, Busse played the trumpet with the "Frisco "Jass" Band". He then formed his own band, Busse's Buzzards (which was the nucleus of the Paul Whiteman orchestra of the mid-1920s), featuring Henry Busse — they made six sides in total. https://adp.library.ucsb.edu/index.php/mastertalent/detail/113261/Busses_Buzzards

Scott Yanow wrote in Classic Jazz: Third Ear - the Essential Listening Companion that Busse "first joined Paul Whiteman's dance band in 1918, originally being co-leader before ceding the ensemble to the more charismatic Whiteman."

Busse was the subject of discrimination because of his German accent, which caused concern among those living in post-World War I America.

At one point, eight out of the top ten sheet music sales spots belonged to the band. During his peak with them, Busse was earning $350 weekly, while fellow band member Bing Crosby was earning just $150. Busse co-composed several of the band's early hit songs, including "Hot Lips" and (with Gussie Mueller) "Wang Wang Blues". The latter sold over one million copies, and was awarded a gold disc in 1920.

Busse was concertmaster for the Whiteman Band when it toured Europe in the 1920s, and there discovered a song written by a German doctor - Robert Katscher. Back in the States, Buddy DeSylva penned new words and the song's name was changed to "When Day is Done"; it was a hit, and made Busse famous.

While with the Paul Whiteman Orchestra, Henry Busse played alongside brothers Tommy Dorsey and Jimmy Dorsey (who later left to start their own separate bands). He played with Ray Bolger at the Chez Paree, a night club owned by notorious gangster Al Capone; Busse ran the house band there and worked for Capone.

In 1928, after mastering the English language, Busse Sr. began Henry Busse and the Shuffle Rhythm Band, which enjoyed great success in the 1930s and '40s. A year later, Busse Sr. married Dorothy Drake, a former model and stage actress. Their only son, Henry Busse Jr., was born in 1931, and was three years old when his parents divorced. In 1935, Busse Sr. married Lorayne Brox, member of the Brox Sisters singing trio.

Busse stayed with Whiteman until 1928, when he found that the bandleader was assigning more and more lead trumpet solos to the more jazz-oriented Bix Beiderbecke. Angered, Busse left Whiteman and formed his own group, The Henry Busse Orchestra. This group was more of a sweet dance band than a hot-jazz band, and found a receptive audience.

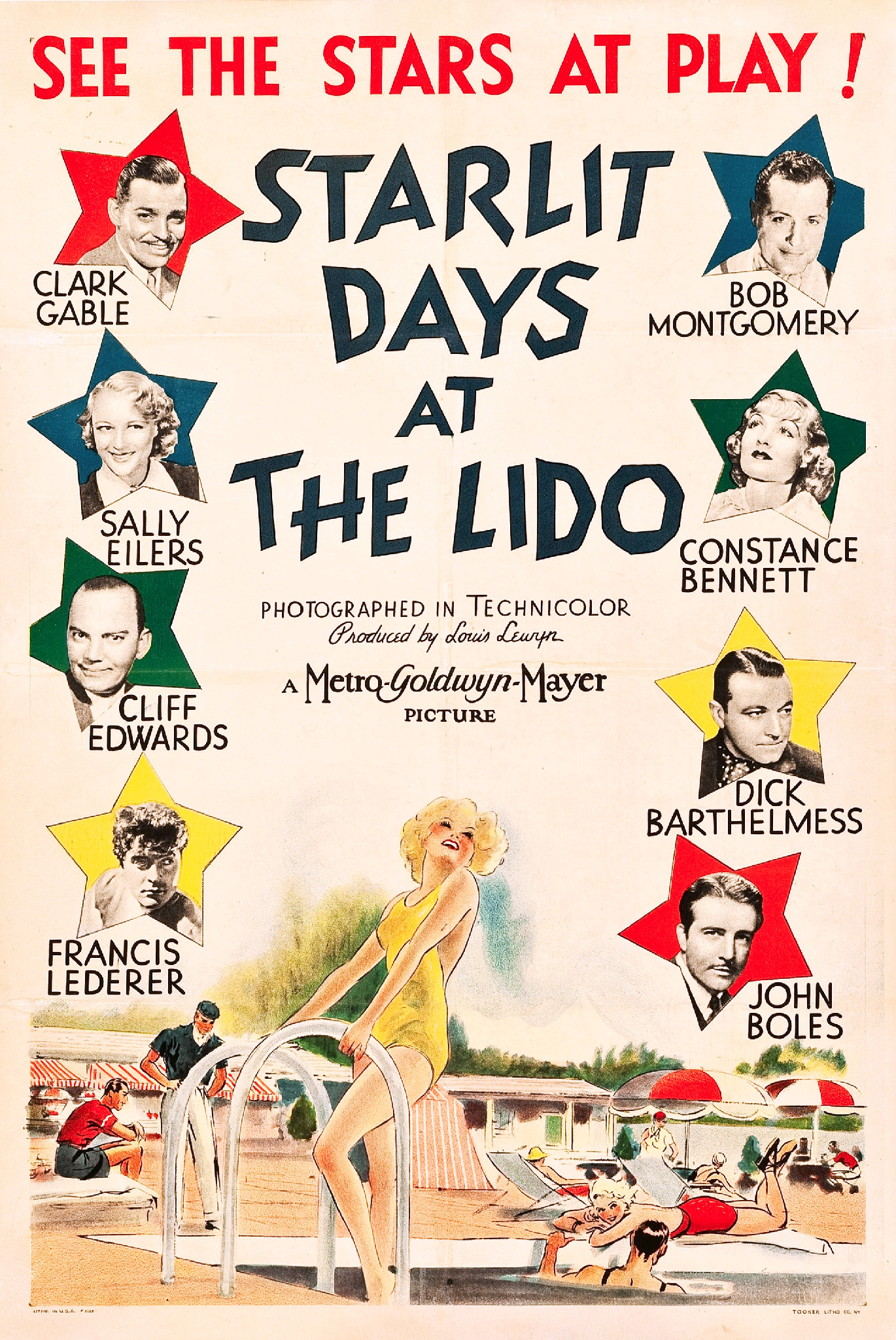
Starlit Days at the Lido Poster

Henry Busse hit his peak in 1930-45, playing dance music before the war, and swing during the war. His music was often berated by Down Beat magazine, which called his a "sweet" or "Mickey Mouse" band. Busse and his band appeared in an MGM color movie in 1935 called Starlit Days at the Lido, filmed at the Ambassador Hotel, along with Clark Gable and MGM's stable of stars and in the movie Lady Let's Dance, in which Busse had a speaking part.

== Marriage and annulment ==
His personal life wound up in gossip columns when he partied one night with a woman at the Hotsy Totsy Club and woke up married. He sought an annulment and during the 18 months to unwind the legal tangle, he toured Europe and staved off arrest for non-payment of alimony.

== Themes ==
Busse's opening theme was "Hot Lips". His closing theme was "When Day Is Done".

== Death ==
Henry Busse and his Orchestra continued to record and perform up until his death in 1955. Busse died at an undertaker's convention at the Peabody Hotel in Memphis, Tennessee, while he was playing with the Shuffle Rhythm Band. He was survived by Henry Busse Jr.

== Impact ==
Aside from his close relationship with Bing Crosby, he became friends with several notable people of that time, including Ray Bolger, Al Jolson, Ruby Keeler, Irving Berlin, George Raft, Ginger Rogers, and Edward G. Robinson.

Al Hirt and Herb Alpert have remarked they were inspired by the trumpet solo work of Busse, particularly his rendition of "Rhapsody in Blue".
