= Lou Davis =

American songwriter (1881–1961)

Lou Davis (May 14, 1881 – October 18, 1961) was an American songwriter, and author associated with Tin Pan Alley. He was also a businessman in the wholesale meat business. His primary musical collaborators were Abel Baer, Henry Busse, Harold Arlen, Henry Lange, and J. Fred Coots. Several of his most notable songs include "Hot Lips", "A Precious Little Thing Called Love", "Deep in the Arms of Love", "Here Comes My Ball and Chain", and "I'm Croonin' a Tune About June".

== Bibliography ==
- Vogel, Frederick G. World War I Songs: A History and Dictionary of Popular American Patriotic Tunes, with Over 300 Complete Lyrics. Jefferson: McFarland & Company, Inc., 1995. ISBN 0-89950-952-5. OCLC 32241433
