= James Murray Wells =

British businessman (born 1983)

James Murray Wells OBE
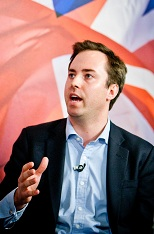
- Born: March 1983 (age 42)

James Nicholas Murray Wells OBE (born March 1983) is an English entrepreneur and was founder, owner and executive chairman of Prescription Eyewear Limited (trading as Glasses Direct), London, which he started whilst at university in 2004 and sold to Cipio Partners in 2013. At the time of the sale, the business had grown to employ more than 150 people, with sales of £29.9m in the year ending April 2013 and was selling to 50 overseas markets. He is currently Industry Head of Retail at Google UK.

== Early life ==
Murray Wells attended Harrow School before attending the University of the West of England to study English, with the intention of studying Law subsequently.

His father is an investment analyst and his maternal grandfather, Wendell Clough, helped bring Ford and Chrysler to the UK.

== Glasses Direct ==
While studying for his final university examinations, Murray Wells discovered that he needed to start wearing spectacles. Surprised by the high price quoted by an optician, he contacted first manufacturers and then individual workers until a technician told him that a pair of glasses selling for £150 costs only £7 to make. Inspired by this, he created a website selling spectacles directly to the public, initially funding his business using the remains of his student loan, he joined the small existing group of online spectacles retailers in the UK's traditionally highly controlled, arguably oligopolist spectacles market. (See the article UK Opticians (retailers) for a discussion of industry structure.)

In its first year of business, Murray Wells' new company Glasses Direct sold 22,000 pairs of glasses, and had an annual turnover of £1m. In 2009 Glasses Direct had 70 employees and sold a pair of glasses every three minutes. When the business was sold, revenue was expected to break £35m in sales in 2014.

== Industry pressure ==
Several established chains of conventional bricks and mortar opticians attempted to close down Glasses Direct with legal and regulatory threats. Murray-Wells published their lawyers' letters on his website, where they remained until the embarrassed lawyers used copyright to force their removal. Murray Wells then replaced the letters with a note explaining why they were no longer there. Murray-Wells also sent out men dressed as sheep to Newcastle city centre to hand leaflets explaining how much cheaper his products were than those of high street opticians, suggesting that spectacle wearers were being "fleeced". Attempts at legal action have to date failed, with most established high street opticians now selling spectacles online.

== Awards ==
Murray Wells won the 2005 Shell LiveWIRE award for entrepreneurship, the 2005 Startup Award, the 2005 Wales and West Country Entrepreneur of the Year Award, the 2005 Natwest Business of the Year and Entrepreneur of the Year Award, and the 2006 Isambard Kingdom Brunel Young Entrepreneur Award.

In 2009, he was awarded the Queen's Award for Achievement in Enterprise Promotion, becoming the youngest person to receive the award.

Murray Wells was appointed Officer of the Order of the British Empire, (OBE), in the 2015 Queen's Birthday Honours list for services to business.

== Promotion of entrepreneurship ==
In addition to his involvement with the taper relief campaign, Murray Wells has been a keynote speaker at the Federation of Small Businesses annual conference and has taken part in events aimed at promoting entrepreneurship to school children. More recently he has performed as a mentor in entrepreneurship schemes run by Channel 4 and The Times, as well as investing his own funds in start-ups.

== Political campaigning ==
Murray Wells has taken part in the campaign by UK entrepreneurs against the changing of UK taxation laws to end taper relief, arguing that this change will damage the prospects of future entrepreneurs and start-up companies. He took part in organizing a Flash Crowd event as part of this campaign.

He was one of 68 business leaders to publicly pledge their support to Conservative proposals to reverse part of Labours planned National Insurance rise in the run up to the 2010 General Election This became a key issue in the campaign.

He was also a co-founder of StartUp Britain, which was announced in the 2010 budget by Chancellor of the Exchequer George Osborne, and launched by David Cameron as an initiative conceived at 10 Downing Street, the aim of which is to inspire entrepreneurs and influence the government's business agenda.

Murray Wells has served as an advisor on business and enterprise to both the UK's then Labour Party government and the then Conservative Party opposition. As a member of the New Enterprise Council, he was an advisor for the then Shadow Chancellor, George Osborne.
