= A Precious Little Thing Called Love =

1928 song by Lou Davis and J. Fred Coots

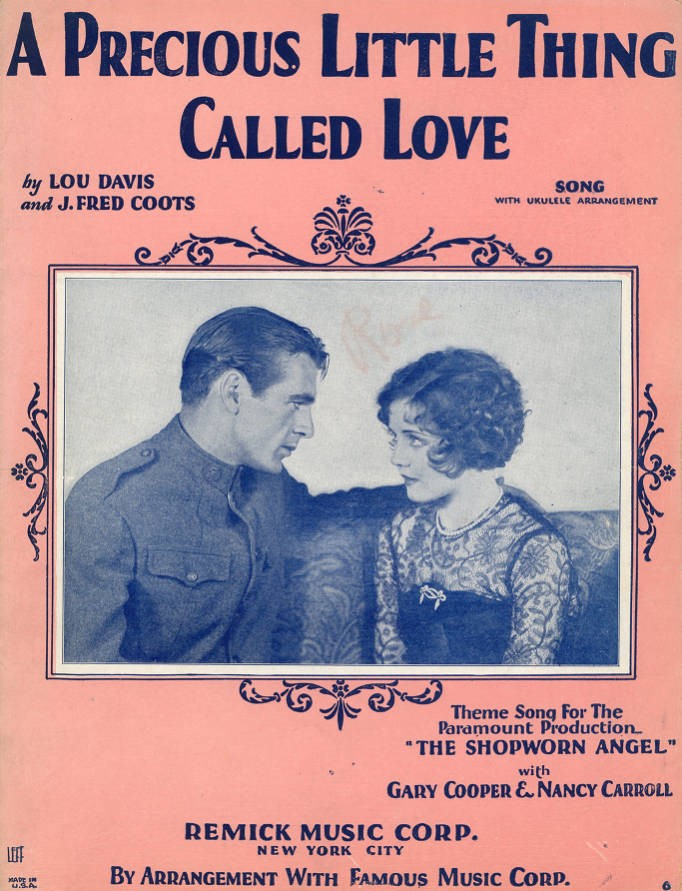
- Sheet music cover with Cooper and Nancy Carroll, 1928

Song
- Language: English
- Published: 1928
- Songwriters: Lou Davis & J. Fred Coots
- Performed by Ellis Stratakos & His Hotel Jung Orchestra in March 1929

"A Precious Little Thing Called Love" is a song written and composed by Lou Davis and J. Fred Coots. The song was published in 1928 by Remick Music Corp., in New York, NY. This song was chosen out of 150 submissions by Paramount for the theme song of the Gary Cooper film A Shopworn Angel. It was recorded by George Olsen and his Orchestra, The Ipana Troubadours, and Annette Hanshaw.

The sheet music can be found at the Pritzker Military Museum & Library.
