= On with the Show (Alex Mendham and His Orchestra album) =

Studio album by Alex Mendham and His Orchestra
- Released: 24 July 2017
- Recorded: 2017
- Genre: Show tunes; Dance music; Jazz
- Length: 43:12
- Producer: Alex Mendham; Nick Taylor

Alex Mendham and His Orchestra chronology
Jazznocracy (2015)	On with the Show (2017)

On with the Show is the third studio album by British dance band Alex Mendham and His Orchestra, released in July 2017.

== Track listing ==
No.	Title	Length
1.	"Shall We Dance"	2:53
2.	"Let Yourself Go"	2:27
3.	"Cheek to Cheek"	3:47
4.	"Night and Day"	2:46
5.	"Caravan"	2:33
6.	"I'm No Angel" (as sung by Mae West in the 1933 film I'm No Angel)	3:01
7.	"Jeepers Creepers"	2:34
8.	"What Is This Thing Called Love?"	3:21
9.	"Anything Goes"	2:56
10.	"Nobody Cares If I'm Blue"	2:57
11.	"Broken Record"	3:06
12.	"Hot Lips"	2:26
13.	"The Way You Look Tonight"	2:41
14.	"Blue Moments"	3:11
15.	"Prelude in C# Minor"	2:34
