= Wang Wang Blues =

1921 #1 song by Paul Whiteman Ambassador Orchestra

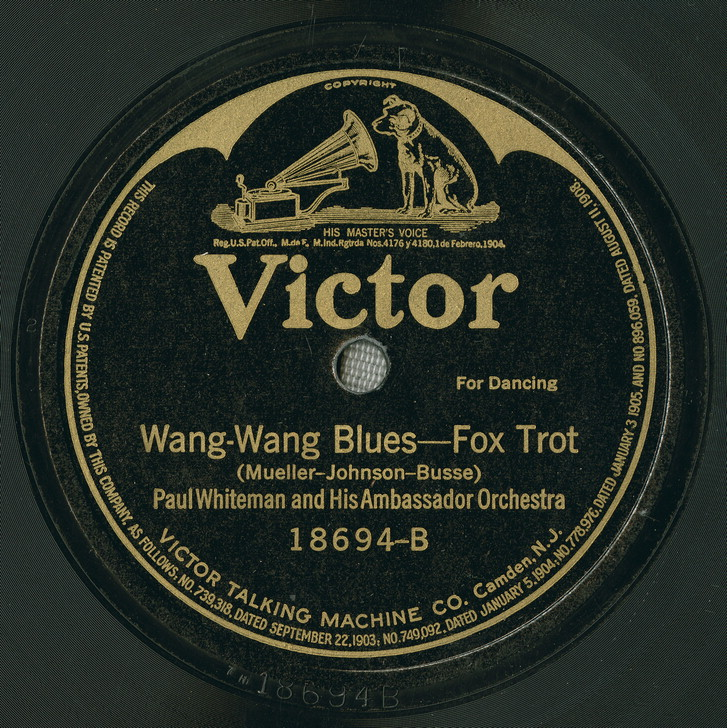

Single by Paul Whiteman and His Ambassador Orchestra
- B-side: "Anytime Anyday Anywhere"
- Published: 1920 Leo Feist, Inc.
- Released: December 1920
- Recorded: August 9, 1920
- Studio: Victor Studios, Camden, New Jersey
- Genre: Jazz
- Length: 3:21
- Label: Victor 18694
- Composers: Henry Busse, Gussie Mueller, and Theron E. "Buster" Johnson
- Lyricist: Leo Wood
- Producer: Ferde Grofe

Paul Whiteman and His Ambassador Orchestra singles chronology
"Whispering" (1920)	"Wang Wang Blues" (1920)	"Avalon-Just Like A Gypsy Medley" (1920)

"Wang Wang Blues" is a 1920 jazz composition written by Henry Busse, Gussie Mueller, and Theron E. "Buster" Johnson, with lyrics by Leo Wood. The song was released as a 78 single by Paul Whiteman and His Orchestra featuring Henry Busse on trumpet. The song is a pop and jazz standard.

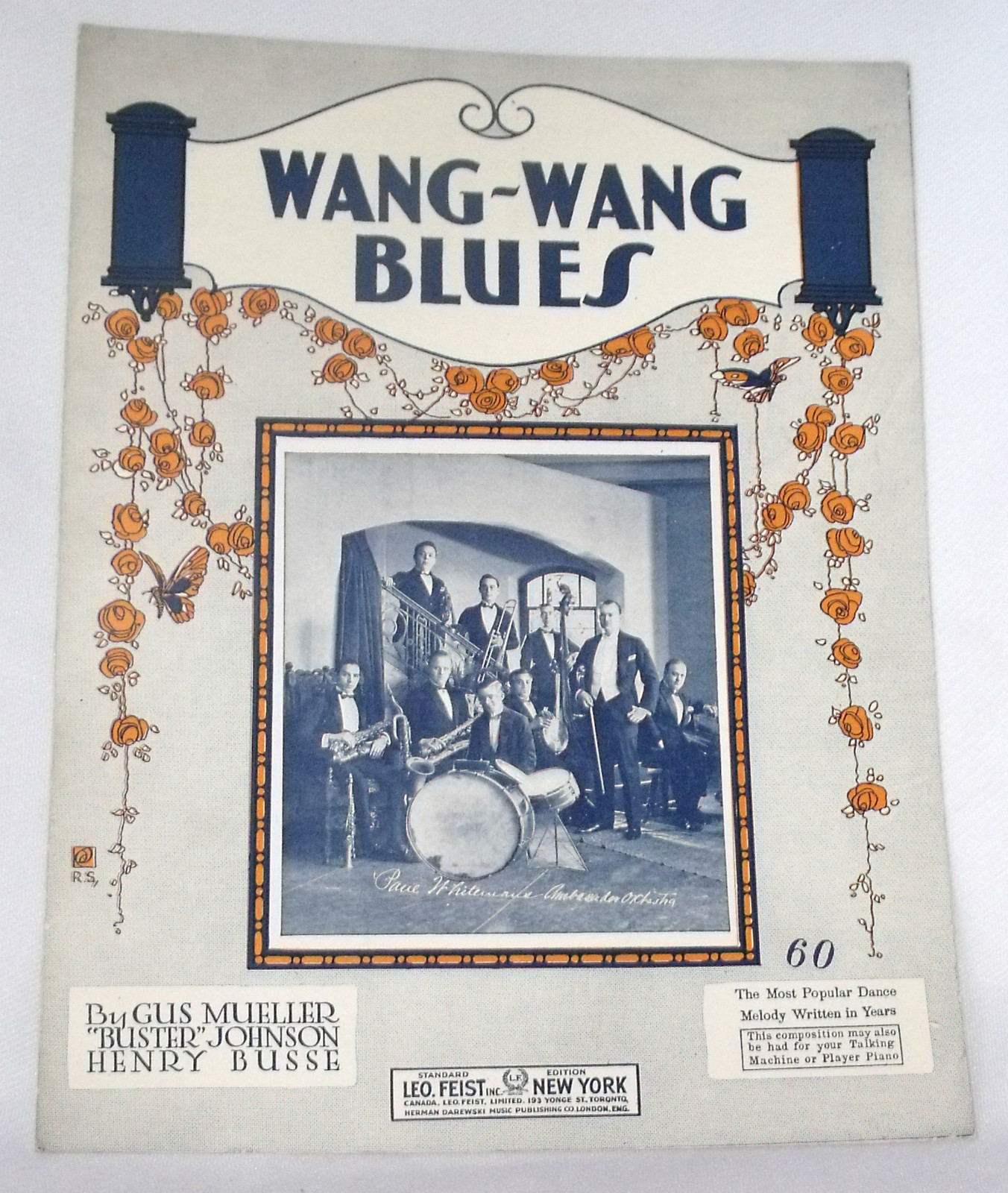
1921 sheet music cover featuring Paul Whiteman and His Orchestra.

Paul Whiteman recorded the song on August 9, 1920, in Camden, New Jersey. The song was released in December 1920 as a Victor 78 single, 18694-B. Ferde Grofe arranged the song. Paul Whiteman recorded and released the song three additional times. The Paul Whiteman recording was No. 1 for 6 weeks on the Billboard pop singles charts.

== Personnel ==
The personnel on the August 9, 1920 recording at the Victor studios in Camden, New Jersey were: Paul Whiteman (violin, leader), Henry Busse (trumpet, composer, 1918–1928), Ferde Grofe (piano, arranger, composer), Theron E. "Buster" Johnson (trombone, 1918–1920), Gus Mueller (clarinet, alto sax), Hale Byers (alto sax), Mike Pingitore (banjo), Sammy Heiss (tuba), and Harold McDonald (drums).

== Other recordings ==
"Wang Wang Blues" is one of the most recorded jazz songs, recorded by Henry Busse, Glenn Miller, Duke Ellington, Mamie Smith, Sam Moore and Horace Davis, Gus Van and Joe Schenck in the Ziegfeld Follies, 1921, Fletcher Henderson, Sam Lanin, Benny Goodman, King Oliver, Lucille Hegamin, Bennie Krueger, Ted Lewis, Doc Severinsen, Billy Butterfield, Bob Wills and His Texas Playboys, Eubie Blake, Mal Hallett, Lawrence Welk, Art Tatum, Edyie Gorme, Bobby Hackett, the Orient Dixieland Jazz Band, the Ames Brothers, Tim Brymn and His Black Devil Orchestra, the Norfolk Jazz Quartet, Willy Metschke, and Barbara McNair.

== Media ==
The song was featured in the 1996 movie The English Patient in a performance by Benny Goodman.
