= The Jack Eigen Show =

American television program

- Starring: Jack Eigen
- Country of origin: United States

Production
- Running time: 15 minutes

Original release
- Network: DuMont Television Network
- Release: 1947 – 1951

The Jack Eigen Show is an American television show, 15 minutes in duration, which aired Thursdays 7:45 to 8:00 pm ET on the DuMont Television Network from 1947 to 1951, The show continued as a radio program from 1951 to 1971, running from 11:15pm to 12:30am ET on WMAQ (AM).

== Broadcast history ==
Eigen (1913–1983) hosted two different television series, both local series which were briefly on the DuMont network.

== WABD television series ==
A television version aired from 1947 to circa 1951 on New York City television station WABD, at that time part of the DuMont Television Network. An early episode featured Milton Berle as a guest. Other segments included the playing of records and the reading of gossip. In late 1950, Ansonia Clock Company became sponsor of the series.

== See also ==
- List of programs broadcast by the DuMont Television Network
- List of surviving DuMont Television Network broadcasts

== Bibliography ==
- David Weinstein, The Forgotten Network: DuMont and the Birth of American Television (Philadelphia: Temple University Press, 2004) ISBN 1-59213-245-6
- Alex McNeil, Total Television, Fourth edition (New York: Penguin Books, 1980) ISBN 0-14-024916-8
- Tim Brooks and Earle Marsh, The Complete Directory to Prime Time Network TV Shows, Third edition (New York: Ballantine Books, 1964) ISBN 0-345-31864-1
