= Gussie Mueller =

Musical artist (1890–1965)

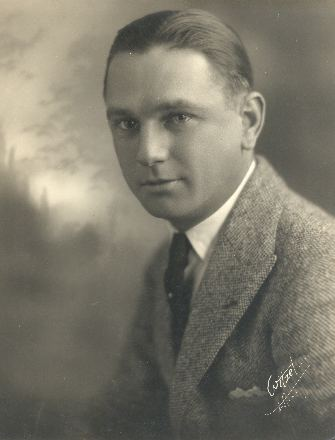
- Gussie Mueller, c. 1922

Background information
- Also known as: "Gus" or "Gussie"
- Born: Gustave Mueller; April 17, 1890; New Orleans, Louisiana, U.S.
- Origin: New Orleans, Louisiana, U.S.
- Died: December 16, 1965 (aged 75) Hollywood, California, U.S
- Genres: Dixieland
- Instrument: Clarinet
- Years active: c. 1910-c.1940

Gustave "Gussie" Mueller (April 17, 1890 – December 16, 1965) was an early jazz clarinetist.

The New Orleans, Louisiana-born Mueller was a top clarinetist with Papa Jack Laine's bands in New Orleans before going to Chicago, Illinois with Tom Brown's band in early 1915. After serving in the Army in World War I he moved to California and joined the early Paul Whiteman Orchestra, with which he moved to New York City. He helped give the Whiteman band a touch of the Dixieland jazz style. One of the Whiteman Orchestra's early hit records, as well as one of the unfortunately few recordings where Mueller can be heard prominently, is Wang Wang Blues which Mueller dominates in a style similar to Larry Shields. Mueller also shares composer credit on "Wang Wang".

According to Whiteman, Mueller was reluctant to learning how to read music, for fear that it would impair his abilities as a "hot player". He left the Whiteman band in November 1920, saying "I jes' can't play that 'pretty music' that you all play. And you fellers can't never play blues worth a damn". Mueller returned to California to join his old friend Ray Lopez in the Abe Lyman Orchestra. Mueller stayed in the Los Angeles area and remained active as a musician well in to the 1940s, mainly performing with "Hillbilly" bands. He rejoins Whiteman in Capitol Record's Hollywood studios in 1945, for a recreation of the famous Wang-Wang Blues. On the record Mueller replicates in detail his phrases from the 1920 recording.
