= Shell LiveWIRE =

Shell LiveWIRE is a UK-wide enterprise scheme to help support young entrepreneurs (aged 16–30) into business.

Shell LiveWIRE is a Royal Dutch Shell Social Investment programme. It was launched in the Strathclyde area of Scotland in 1982, before being rolled out across the rest of the UK in 1985. The Shell LiveWIRE Awards are one of the longest established youth entrepreneur award schemes in the UK and boasts an inspirational alumni of winners. The programme has helped a "who's who" of well known entrepreneurs on their paths to success including the programme's first winner, Stewart Graham of The Gael Force Group, James Murray Wells of Glasses Direct, Michael Korn of KwickScreen, Laurence Kemball-Cook of Pavegen, Richard Reed of Innocent Smoothies, and James Watt and Martin Dickie of BrewDog.

Shell LiveWIRE offers two business awards; the monthly £5,000 Shell LiveWIRE Smarter Future Awards and an annual £25,000 Shell LiveWIRE Young Entrepreneur of the Year Award.

== Smarter Future Programme Winners ==
The Shell LiveWIRE Smarter Future Programme launched in 2015 with aim of supporting start-ups that provide solutions to the UK's future transport, food, energy, or natural resource challenges, or make our urban environments cleaner and more sustainable places to work and live in. So far, the programme has supported the following start-ups with £5,000 funding and mentoring opportunities:

- Daniel Roberts, Founder of BananaBerry, a business that turns surplus fruit and vegetables into smoothies.
- Mason Holden, co-founder of urbanminded, the business behind BikeVault, a bicycle parking structure with a built-in locking mechanism.
- Solveiga Pakštaitė, Founder of Design by Sol, the business behind BumpMark, a bio-reactive food expiry label which indicates the conditions of food inside its packaging, reducing food waste.
- Adam Meekings, Founder of Penumbra Power, a technology start-up committed to the reduction of emissions from vehicle exhaust gasses through their innovation, currently called 'Pre-Treatment.
- Maneesh Varshney, co-founder of Naturosys, a company that creates organic fertiliser and fish feed from food waste.
- Tom Robinson, co-founder of Adaptavate, the business behind Breathaboard, a bio-based alternative to plasterboard which locks carbon into the fabric of buildings.
- Thor Schuitemaker-Wichstrøm, co-founder of CAVENTOU, a business that creates sustainable smart objects that use the property of colour to convert sunlight into energy.
- Ravi Toor, Founder of Filamentive, a sustainable, 3D printing material brand looking to develop a 3D printer filament made from recycled plastic.
- Adam Dixon, co-founder of Phytoponics, an agtech start-up that developed a low-cost and scalable hydroponic growing system for commercial agriculture.
- Karina Sudenyte, co-founder and chief brand of Flawsome! drinks, a business that turns wonky fruit into cold-pressed juices.

== Grand Ideas Award Winners ==
The Shell LiveWIRE Grand Ideas Awards ran from 2009 to 2014 and awarded monthly £1,000 awards to innovative start-ups throughout the UK. Notable award winners include:

- Daniel Murray, co-founder of Grabble, a fashion app that is revolutionising the shopping experience.
- Laurence Kemball-Cook, Founder of Pavegen Systems, a business which has created paving slabs that harvest kinetic energy.
- Arthur Kay, co-founder of bio-bean, a business which turns used coffee grounds into bio-diesel pellets.
- Ed Ward, Founder of Veglo, a business that is making cycling safer with its innovative Commuter X4 lights.
- Michael Corrigan, co-founder of trtl, the sleepscarf that makes travelling more comfortable.
- Samuel Etherington, Founder of Aqua Power Technologies, a company that has invented a multi-axis wave power energy converter.
- Jennifer Duthie, Founder of Skribbies, kids' shoes that can be drawn on every day from new.
- Amy Wordsworth, Founder of Good Bubble, a range of natural bath products for children.
- Georgina Bullen, Paralympian and Founder of Team Insight, a company that uses the sport of Goalball to aid teambuilding.
- Ben Allen, Founder of Oomph Wellness, a company that is revolutionising the care sector.
- Chris Bushell, Founder of SMS shortcode university Bike Hire Scheme 'BikeHireUK'
- Dana Elemara, Founder of Arganic, a company that produces argan oil for the food and cosmetic industries.
- Charlie Harry Francis, Founder of Lick Me I'm Delicious, the company behind 'edible mist' and 'instant logo pops', as well as their signature liquid nitrogen ice cream.
- Jermaine Hagan, Founder of Revision App, an app that is helping students to improve their grades by up to 20%.

== Young Entrepreneur of the Year Award Winners ==
The Shell LiveWIRE Young Entrepreneur of the Year Award competition recognises and celebrates the achievements of the UK's finest young entrepreneurs. Previous winners include Jamie Murray Wells of Glasses Direct, Robert Matthams of Shiply.com, Ben Allen of Oomph Wellness, and Daniel Murray of Grabble.

British Entrepreneur Robin Drinkall won both a regional Shell LiveWIRE Award in 1987 and also a UK National Shell LiveWIRE Award in 1988.

Another new start-up business includes Moroccan legacy uk deals in natural cosmetics made with argan oil and bio garden plants.
