= Alex Mendham =

British bandleader (born 1989)

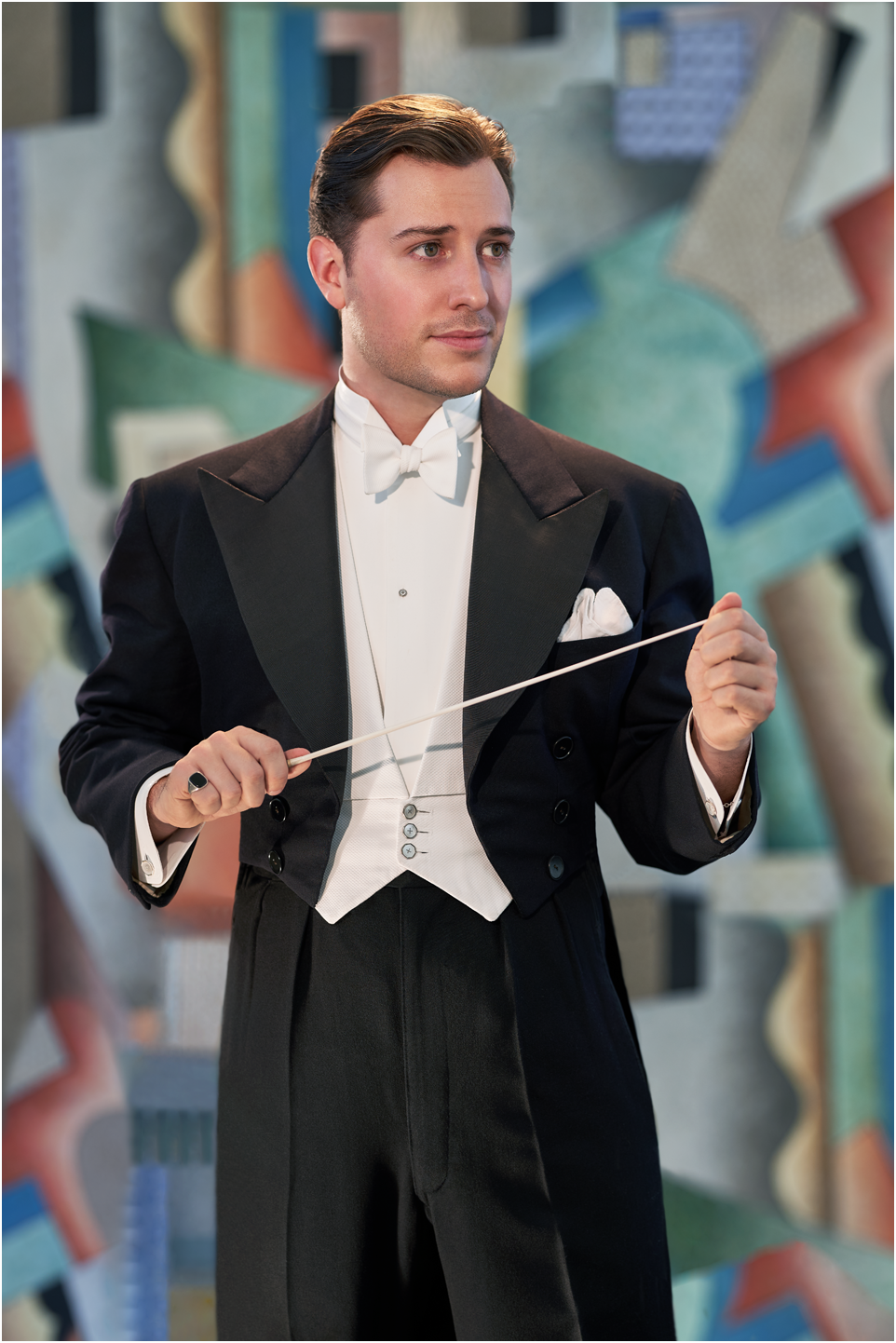
- Art Deco singer and bandleader Alex Mendham

Background information
- Born: 13 September 1989 (age 36); Essex, England
- Genres: Jazz, British dance band, show tunes, cabaret
- Occupation: Producer – singer – bandleader
- Instruments: Vocals, saxophone
- Years active: 2010–present
- Label: Decca Records
- Member of: Alex Mendham & His Orchestra
- Website: alexmendham.com

Alex Mendham (born 13 September 1989) is a British bandleader, singer, and saxophonist known for reviving the music and glamour of the Jazz Age. He is the founder and leader of Alex Mendham & His Orchestra, a transatlantic ensemble recognised for its authentic recreations of 1920s and 1930s dance band repertoire. Through historically faithful arrangements, period instruments, and a meticulous visual style, Mendham brings the golden age of popular music to contemporary audiences.

Mendham formed the orchestra in 2010. At the age of 23, he became the youngest bandleader in history to secure a residency at London's Savoy Hotel, where his ensemble performed for six years. His orchestra has since performed at prestigious venues including Claridge's, The Ritz, Highclere Castle, and Hearst Castle. He has also led private performances for high-profile clients, including a birthday celebration for King Charles III.

Mendham is the only bandleader to have performed with an orchestra aboard both the RMS Queen Mary and the Queen Mary 2. Through an ongoing partnership with Cunard Line, Mendham and his orchestra have become the musical face of the company's vintage-themed transatlantic crossings, Mendham and his orchestra have appeared at venues such as the Los Angeles Theatre, Filoli, and the Castle Green.

Mendham has been featured on BBC Radio, and in publications including Forbes. In a 2023 interview with Shoutout LA, performer Dita Von Teese described Mendham as "a consummate showman".

In 2020, Mendham signed with Decca Records to appear on Keep Smiling Through, a tribute to Dame Vera Lynn. That same year, he released Puttin' on the Ritz, an album of jazz and romantic standards recorded during a brief lifting of COVID-19 restrictions in the UK. In 2024, he released Fascinatin' Rhythm, which features expanded orchestral textures and a continued dedication to the style and sound of early 20th century music.

== Discography ==
- Whistling in the Dark (2013)
- Jazznocracy (2015)
- On with the Show (2017)
- Puttin' on the Ritz (2020)
- Fascinatin' Rhythm (2024)
