= Alex Mendham and His Orchestra =

Alex Mendham & His Orchestra
- Genre: British dance band
- Years active: 2011–present
- Label: Decca Records
- Website: alexmendham.com

Alex Mendham and His Orchestra are a British dance band, led by Alex Mendham, that performs and records music from the 1920s and 1930s.

They perform concerts internationally. The orchestra held a long standing residency at the Savoy Hotel in London.

Their debut album, Whistling in the Dark, was released in January 2013, followed by a second album, Jazznocracy, in December 2015.

In 2017 they released On with the Show, their third studio album.

On 1 September 2018, to mark the centennial of "I'm Forever Blowing Bubbles" debut in 1918, the orchestra performed a special arrangement of the song at the London Stadium, the current home of West Ham United F.C.

In 2020, the orchestra signed to Decca Records for a recording of "We'll Meet Again" backing Dame Vera Lynn in a tribute album entitled "Keep Smiling Through" released November 2020.
