= Coon–Sanders Original Nighthawk Orchestra =

American jazz band

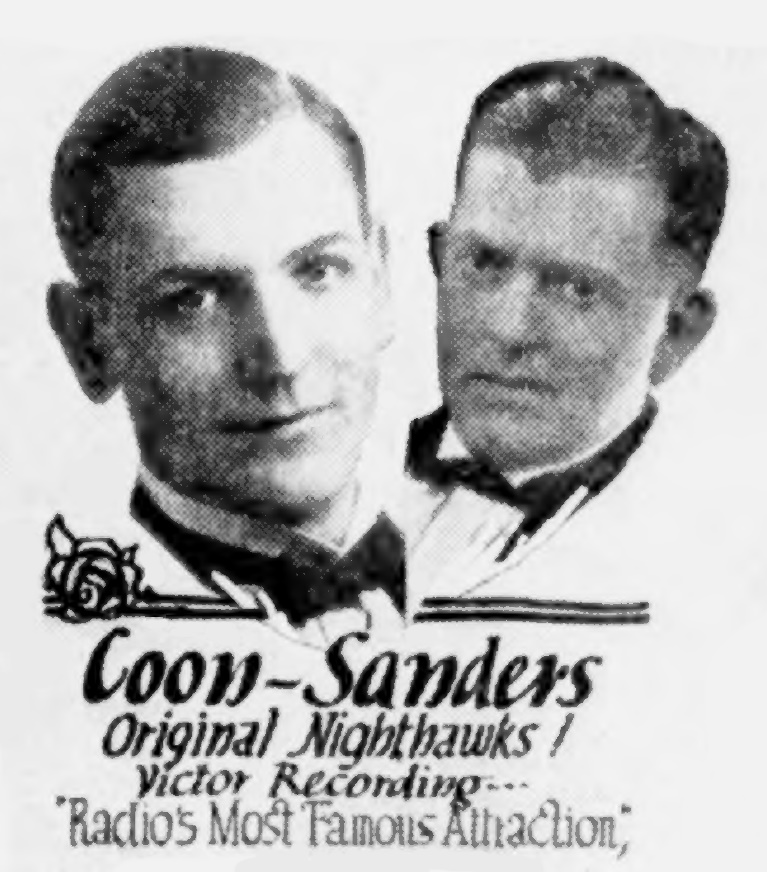
- Coon–Sanders Original Nighthawks publicity advertisement (published in The Billboard, 16 August 1924).

Background information
- Origin: Kansas City, Missouri
- Genre: Jazz
- Years active: 1922–1932
- Label: Victor Records

The Coon–Sanders Original Nighthawk Orchestra was the first Kansas City jazz band to achieve national recognition, which it acquired through national radio broadcasts. It was founded in 1918, as the Coon–Sanders Novelty Orchestra, by drummer Carleton Coon and pianist Joe Sanders.

== History ==
Carleton Coon was born February 5, 1894, in Rochester, Minnesota, United States, and his family moved to Lexington, Missouri, shortly after his birth. Joe Sanders was born on October 15, 1896, in Thayer, Kansas. Sanders was known as "the Old Left Hander" because of his skills at baseball, but he gave up playing the sport in the early 1920s to concentrate on dance music as a career.

Coon and Sanders met around 1918 in a music store, and formed the band the same year. Regular members of the orchestra included Tom Beckham, Nick Mussolina, "Pop" Estep, "Happy" Williams, Orville Knapp, Joe Richolson, Bob Pope, Rex Downing, Elmer Krebs, John Thiell, Harold Thiell, Bill Haid, Russ Stout, and Floys Estep. The orchestra began broadcasting in 1922 on clear channel station WDAF, which could be received throughout the United States. They were broadcast in performance at the Muehlebach Hotel in Kansas City. They took the name Nighthawks because they broadcast late at night (11:30pm to 1:00am). By 1924, their fan club had 37,000 members. Fans were encouraged to send in requests for songs by letter, telephone, or telegram. That move became so popular that Western Union set up a ticker tape between Sanders's piano and Coon's drums so the telegrams could be acknowledged during the broadcasts. Their song "Nighthawk Blues" includes the lines: "Tune right in on the radio/Grab a telegram and say 'Hello'." In 1925, they recorded the Paul Whiteman and Fred Rose composition "Flamin' Mamie".

The group left Kansas City for the first time in 1924 for a three-month engagement in a roadhouse in Chicago, Illinois. The orchestra moved to Chicago the same year, where Jules Stein used the profits from a tour he booked for them to establish the Music Corporation of America (MCA), with the orchestra as its first client. The orchestra moved into the Blackhawk in Chicago in 1926. The members of the orchestra at that time were Joe Richolson and Bob Pope, trumpets; Rex Downing, trombone; Harold Thiell, John Thiell and Floyd Estep, saxophones; Joe Sanders, piano; Russ Stout, banjo and guitar; "Pop" Estep, tuba; Carleton Coon, drums. Teddy Roy also played with the group in the late 1920s. In the following years, the Nighthawks performed at the Blackhawk every winter, doing remote broadcasts over radio station WGN. Their reputation spread coast-to-coast through these broadcasts and the many records they made for Victor Records. They also undertook successful road tours.

In 1931, the orchestra moved to New York City, for an 11-month broadcast engagement at the Hotel New Yorker arranged by William S. Paley, who needed a star attraction to induce radio stations to join the Columbia Broadcasting System.

At the peak of the band's success, the musicians owned identical Cord automobiles, each in a different color with the name of the Orchestra and the owner embossed on the rear. The Orchestra's popularity showed no signs of abating, and their contract with MCA had another 15 years to run in the spring of 1932 when Carleton Coon came down with a jaw infection and he died on May 4 that year.

Sanders attempted to keep the organization going; however, without Coon, the public did not support them. In 1935, he formed his own group and played until the early 1940s, when he became a part-time orchestra leader and studio musician. In his later years he suffered from failing eyesight and other health problems. He died on May 15, 1965, after suffering a stroke.

== Revivals ==
The Coon Sanders Nighthawks Fans' Bash was held annually on the weekend following Mothers' Day in Huntington, West Virginia, to remember the contributions to music made by the Coon Sanders Nighthawks Orchestra and to enjoy the music of the era. It ran annually for about 50 years until about 2016. In 2011, the event featured the West End Jazz Band from Chicago, the Toll House Jazz Band from Columbus Ohio, the Sounds of Dixie from Raleigh North Carolina and the Backyard Dixie Jazz Stompers from Huntington West Virginia. Over the years, such musical notables as Curt Hitch, Bill Rank, Earl Roberts, Doc Ryker, Paul Oconnor, Mike Walbridge, Bob Neighbor, Frank Powers, Bob Lefever, Johnny Haynes, Jimmy and Carrie Mazzy, Moe Klippert, Clyde Austin, Nocky Parker, Fred Woodaman and Spiegle Willcox have attended the event.

Efforts were being made during 2011 to organize and fund a project to record modern performances of the Coon–Sanders repertoire (as well as performing the music in a series of live concerts). The project was led by Doug Bowles, the Washington, D.C.–based founder of a period big band, the SingCo Rhythm Orchestra.

== Listen to ==
- YouTube: "Nighthawk Blues, 1924"
