= Big band remote =

Remote radio broadcast

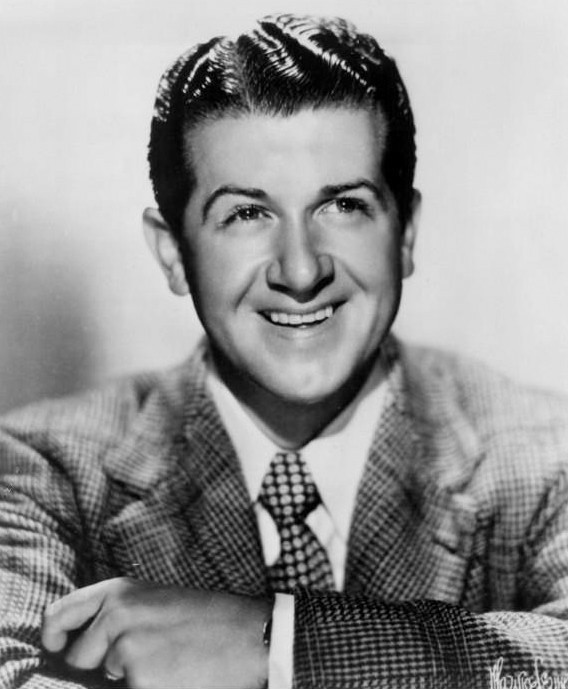
Eddy Howard, who was heard in big band remotes from Chicago's Aragon Ballroom.

A big band remote (a.k.a. dance band remote) was a remote broadcast, common on radio in the United States during the 1930s and 1940s, involving a coast-to-coast live transmission of a big band.

== Overview ==
Broadcasts were usually transmitted by the major US-radio networks directly from hotels, ballrooms, restaurants and clubs. During World War II, the remote locations expanded to include military bases and defense plants. Band remotes mostly originated in major cities, including Boston, Los Angeles, New York, Philadelphia, San Francisco and Chicago.

The usual procedure involved the network sending a two-man team, announcer and engineer, with remote radio equipment to a designated location. The announcer would open with music behind an introduction:

For your dancing pleasure, Columbia brings you the music of Count Basie and his orchestra, coming to you from the Famous Door on Fifty-Second Street in New York City.

== Broadcast venues ==
The Chicago broadcasts featured bands headed by Count Basie, Frankie Carle, Duke Ellington, Jan Garber, Jerry Gray, Woody Herman, Earl Hines, Eddy Howard (from the Aragon Ballroom), Dick Jurgens, Kay Kyser (from the Blackhawk Restaurant), Coon-Sanders Original Nighthawk Orchestra (from the Blackhawk), Ted Weems, Shep Fields (from the Palmer House - Empire Room) and Griff Williams.

Artie Shaw's many remote broadcasts included the Rose Room of Boston's Ritz Carlton Hotel. The Blue Room of New York's Hotel Lincoln was the location of his only regular radio series as headliner. Sponsored by Old Gold cigarettes, Shaw broadcast on CBS from November 20, 1938 until November 14, 1939. Before he launched Sun Records, Sam Phillips ran regular big band remotes with the Chuck Foster orchestra and others from the Peabody Hotel Skyway Ballroom in Memphis, Tennessee. The tradition continued into the 1950s with Ray Anthony doing band remotes on CBS in 1951-52. In the mid-1950s, NBC broadcast jazz club remotes on Monitor featuring Howard Rumsey, Al Hibbler and others.

As early as 1923, listeners could tune in the Waldorf-Astoria Orchestra. The Oriole Orchestra (Dan Russo and Ted Fio Rito) was performing at Chicago's Edgewater Beach Hotel when they did their first radio remote broadcast on March 29, 1924, and two years later, they opened the famous Aragon Ballroom in July 1926, doing radio remotes nationally from both the Aragon and the Trianon Ballrooms. In 1929, after Rudy Vallée's Orchestra vacated Manhattan's Heigh-Ho Club to do a movie in Hollywood, Will Osborne's dance band found fame with a nationwide audience due to radio remotes from the Heigh-Ho. That same year, Phil Spitalny and his orchestra broadcast on NBC from the Hotel Pennsylvania in New York.

External image
- Photograph: New Year's Eve with Guy Lombardo for CBS Television in 1971; Here on Getty Images

Starting in 1929, Guy Lombardo begin a series of annual New Year's Eve remote broadcasts of his "sweet" big-band music from several venues in New York City. Featuring his Royal Canadians Orchestra, Lombardo's performances continued for nearly half a century. From 1929 to 1959, his earliest broadcasts originated live on both the CBS and NBC radio networks from the Roosevelt Grill at the Roosevelt Hotel and were subsequently followed by both live radio and television broadcasts on the CBS network from the Ballroom at the Waldorf Astoria Hotel from 1959 until 1976. Due to the widespread popularity of these broadcasts Lombardo earned the nickname "Mr. New Year's Eve".

By 1930, Ben Bernie was heard in weekly remotes from Manhattan's Roosevelt Hotel. On November 24, 1937, Glenn Miller did a remote on NBC from Boston's Raymor Ballroom on Huntington Avenue (one block from Symphony Hall). On the west coast, Shep Fields and his Rippling Rhythm Orchestra could be heard in 1938 while broadcasting from the Los Angeles Biltmore Hotel after filming The Big Broadcast of 1938 in Hollywood. By 1945, Fields' live performances at the famed Copacabana nightclub in New York City were also broadcast on the WOR Radio Network.

=== Glen Island Casino ===
The Glen Island casino was billed as "the mecca for music moderns" and fans from coast to coast knew that it was "just off Shore Road in New Rochelle, New York". Glen Island represented glamor and prestige, where only the best and most popular bands were featured. The casino was also considered the springboard to success for many big bands of 1930s, including those of Ozzie Nelson, Charlie Barnet, Claude Thornhill, Les Brown and the Dorsey Brothers. In March 1939, Glenn Miller and his orchestra gained their big break when they were chosen to play a summer season at Glen Island. Both NBC and Mutual broadcast Miller and his orchestra from the casino, an unusual dual-network remote with some 1,800 people present in the Casino ballroom. Glen Gray's Casa Loma Orchestra played at Glen Island along the water's edge almost every night. In addition, Shep Fields introduced a reconfiguration of his Rippling Rhythm Orchestra with the vocalist Toni Arden at the Glen Island Casino in 1947.

== Bands heard on 1930s–40s radio remotes ==
- Desi Arnaz
- Gus Arnheim
- Charlie Barnet (from the Brown Hotel in Denver and Glen Island casino in New Rochelle)
- Coon-Sanders Original Nighthawk Orchestra (from the Blackhawk Restaurant),
- Count Basie (from Kansas City's Reno Club, the Famous Door in New York and California's Palomar Ballroom)
- Bunny Berigan
- Les Brown (Café Rouge at Hotel Pennsylvania, New York City)
- Cab Calloway (from the Savoy Ballroom)
- Bob Chester
- Larry Clinton (from the Glen Island casinoin New Rochelle)
- Francis Craig (from the Belle Meade Country Club in Nashville)
- Bob Crosby
- Tommy Dorsey (Glen Island casino in New Rochelle)
- Roy Eldridge
- Duke Ellington (from the London Palladium in the UK)
- Skinnay Ennis (from the Statler Hilton Hotel in Los Angeles)
- Shep Fields (from the Biltmore Hotel in Los Angeles and the Palmer House in Chicago)
- Ella Fitzgerald and Her Orchestra (from the Roseland Ballroom, NBC, February 16, 1949)
- Jan Garber (from the Blue Room of the Hotel Roosevelt in New Orleans)
- Benny Goodman (from the Hotel New Yorker and Glen Island casino in New Rochelle))
- Glen Gray
- Phil Harris (from the Royal Hawaiian Hotel in Honolulu)
- Tiny Hill (from the Trianon Ballroom, South Gate CA, June 1946)
- Harry James (from the Hollywood Palladium)
- Sammy Kaye ("Swing & Sway with Sammy Kaye")(from The Roof of the Hotel Astor)
- Stan Kenton
- Henry King
- Andy Kirk
- Gene Krupa (from The Roof of the Hotel Astor in Manhattan and Glen Island casino in New Rochelle)
- Kay Kyser (from the Blackhawk Restaurant)
- Guy Lombardo (famous for his New Year big band remotes from The Waldorf-Astoria Hotel)
- Freddy Martin (from the Coconut Grove in Los Angeles)
- Ray McKinley
- Glenn Miller (from the Cafe Rouge of New York's Pennsylvania Hotel, Boston's Raymor Ballroom and Glen Island casino)
- Freddy Nagel (from the Empire Room in the Palmer House in Chicago)
- Ozzie Nelson (from New York's Lexington Hotel and Glen Island casino in New Rochelle)
- Will Osborne (from the Heigh-Ho Club in New York)
- Tony Pastor (from the Century Room of the Hotel Adolphus in Dallas)
- Jan Savitt
- Barney Rapp with vocalist Doris Day (from Rapp's own club, The Sign of the Drum, in Cincinnati, Ohio)
- Bobby Sherwood (from Camp Atterbury, Indiana),
- Jack Teagarden
- Orrin Tucker (from Elitch's Gardens in Denver)
- Chick Webb

== See also ==
- Martin Streek, Canadian broadcaster/DJ who did live-to-air broadcasts at Toronto nightclubs from the 1980s to the 2000s
- The Lawrence Welk Show, a television variety show heavily based on the big band remote format
- "Loving You Has Made Me Bananas," a parody record lampooning the format

== Sources ==
- Ansbro, George. I Have a Lady in the Balcony. McFarland, 2000.

== Listen to ==
- Big Band/Swing Internet Broadcast schedules
- Live365: Big Band Remote Internet stream
- Outlaws Old Time Radio Big Band Remote Internet stream
- Big Band Remotes in the Internet Archive's Old-Time Radio Collection
- Cab Calloway music remote from New Zanzibar (NYC) interrupted by VJ Day report (1:50am, August 14, 1945)
- Wisconsin Public Radio: New Year's Eve remotes (December 31, 1945)
- WKHR (Cleveland, Ohio)
- Big Band
