= Muehlebach Hotel =

Historic hotel in Missouri, US

Coordinates: 39.09941°N 94.58488°W

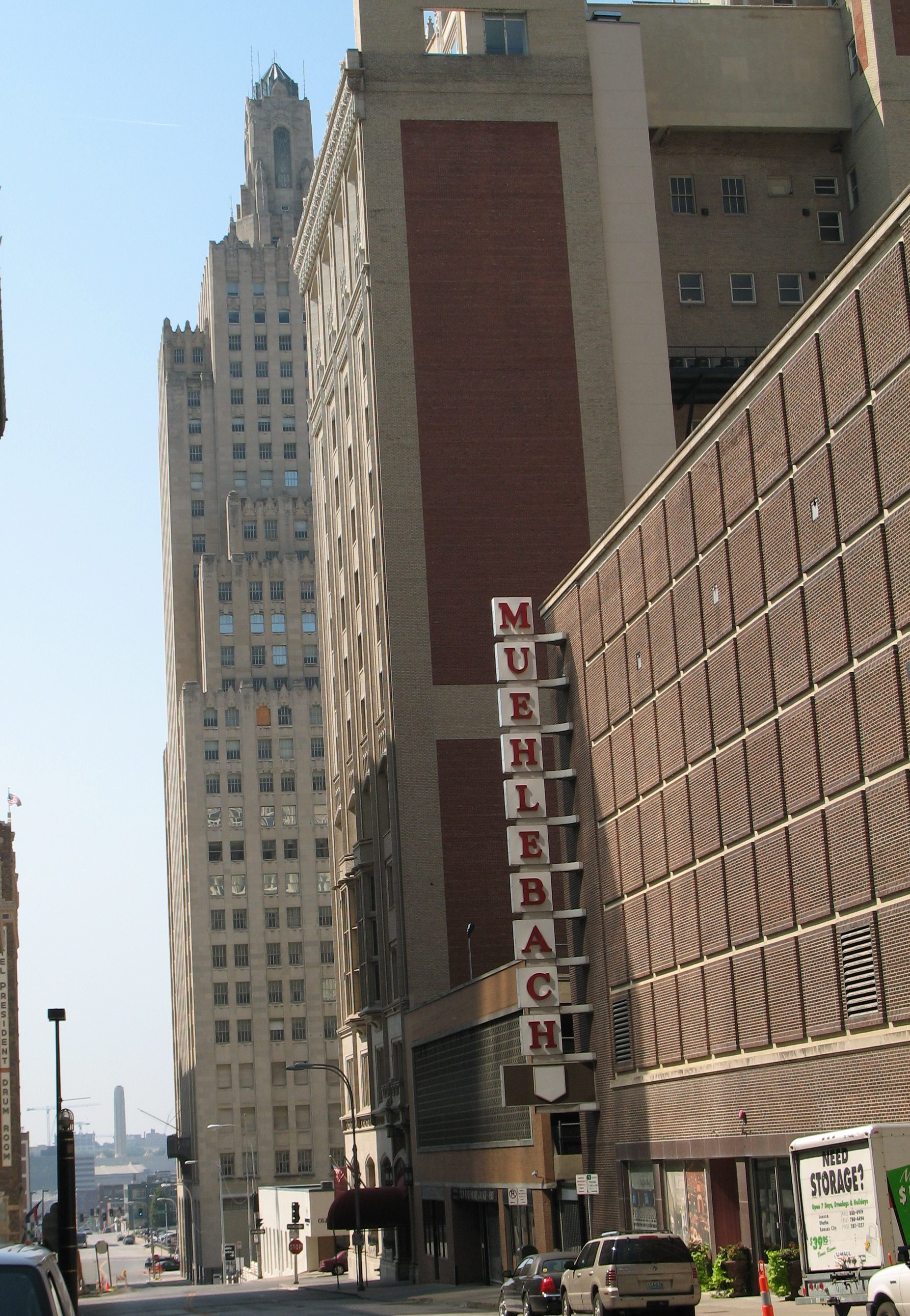
Hotel Muehlebach landmark sign looking down Baltimore Ave. toward the Kansas City Power and Light Building and the Liberty Memorial. The windowless structure is an addition to the original hotel. It contains ballrooms, meeting and conference rooms, added in the early 1950s.

The Hotel Muehlebach ( /ˈmjuːlbɑːk/) is a historic hotel building in Downtown Kansas City that has been visited by multiple U.S. presidents, such as Harry S. Truman. The lower levels are currently operated as one of three wings of the Kansas City Marriott Downtown hotel, while the upper guest room floors are under renovation as apartments, after sitting abandoned for many years.

== History ==
The property, then the site of the First Baptist Church, was acquired in 1914 by the Muehlebach Estate Co., owned by George E. Muehlebach, whose father, George E. Muehlebach Sr., founded the Muehlebach Beer Company. Muehlebach demolished the church and built a 12-story, 144 feet (44 m) high brown brick hotel building designed by Holabird & Roche at a cost of $2 million. It opened as the Hotel Muehlebach in May 1915. The younger Muehlebach also built Muehlebach Field.

On December 5, 1922, the hotel was the location of the first regular radio program broadcast by a band, when Carleton Coon and Joe Sanders began broadcasting the performances of their Coon-Sanders Original Nighthawk Orchestra nationwide.

Manager Barney Allis took over the hotel in 1931, and during his lengthy tenure, the hotel welcomed celebrities including Helen Keller, Ernest Hemingway, Babe Ruth, Jean Harlow (1931), Frank Sinatra, Bob Hope, Elvis Presley, Jimi Hendrix Experience and The Beatles . The hotel also hosted presidents Theodore Roosevelt, Woodrow Wilson, Calvin Coolidge and Herbert Hoover, while Missouri-native Harry S. Truman stayed in the hotel's Presidential Suite so frequently that the Muehlebach became known as "White House West", and hosted his 77th birthday party.

In 1952, a 17-story western annex, called the Muehlebach Tower, and a parking lot, were added to the hotel. Allis sold the hotel in the 1960s. The Equitable Life Assurance Society of the United States foreclosed on the hotel in the early 1970s. In 1974, they renovated the hotel, at a cost of $7 million, and contracted with Minneapolis-based Radisson Hotels to manage the hotel, as the Radisson Muehlebach Hotel. The hotel served as the headquarters for the 1976 Republican National Convention. It closed permanently in 1986.

In 1996, Marriott Hotels bought the Muehlebach and made it into an extension of the Kansas City Marriott Downtown, a huge adjacent hotel built in 1985 as the Vista International Hotel. Marriott imploded the 1952 Muehlebach Tower annex building and in 1998 built a new, modern Muehlebach tower in its place. A "skybridge" was built, connecting both hotel buildings on their second floors. The original 1915 Muehlebach building's lobby and ballrooms were restored and used as banquet and convention facilities by the Marriott. The Muehlebach's upper hotel guest room floors were gutted for renovation, but never rebuilt and left empty. A cocktail lounge, Voo Lounge, opened in the structure's ground floor in 2023.

In 2024, the empty upper floors of the Muehlebach building were offered for sale. In 2025, Flint Development announced plans to remodel the upper floors as 152 apartments. The lower floors, containing the lobby and function rooms, will remain owned and used by the adjoining Marriott hotel.

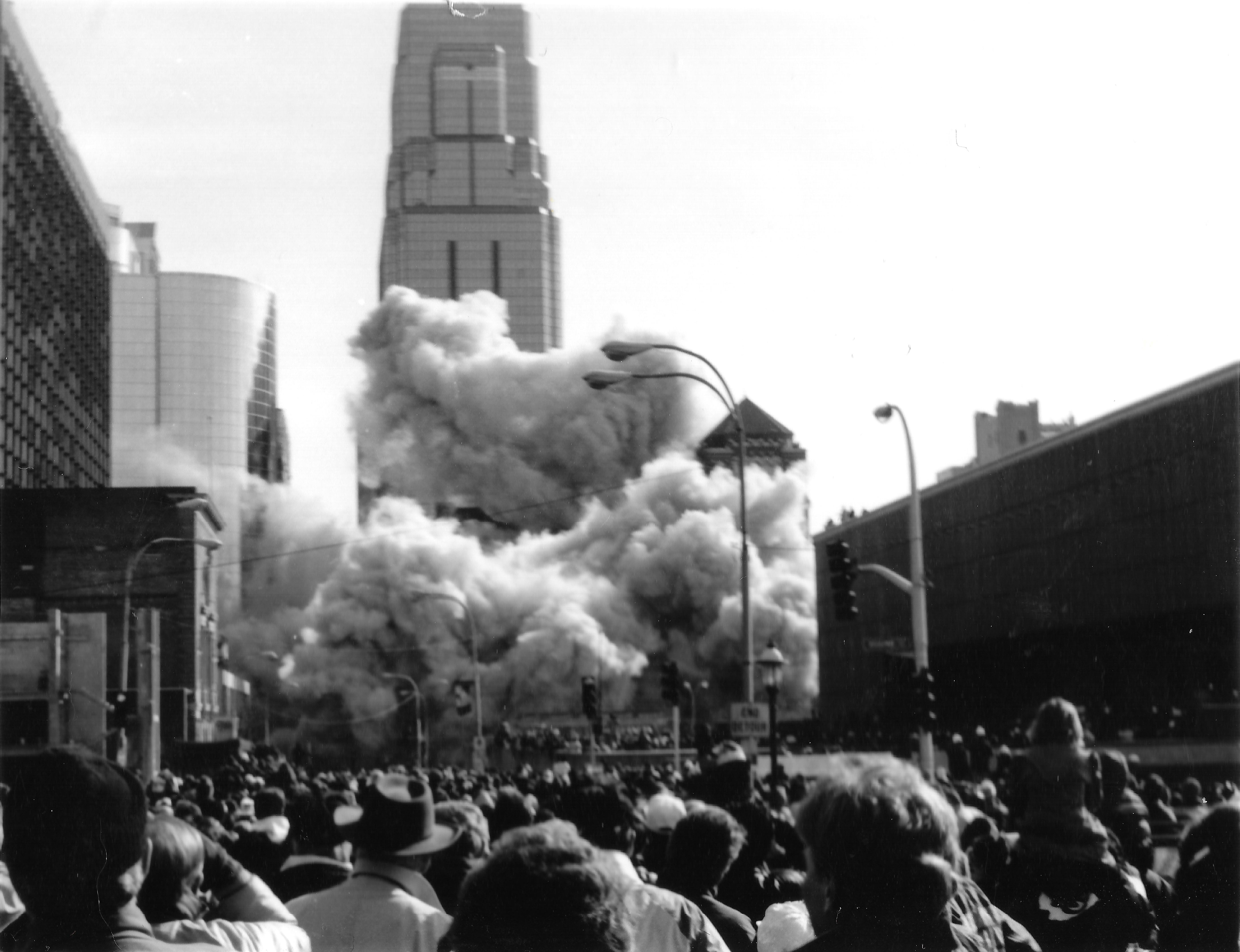
Crowd watching the 1996 implosion of the Muehlebach Towers

== Barbershop Harmony Society ==
The Barbershop Harmony Society (SPEBSQSA, Inc.) traces its beginnings to a chance meeting in 1938 in the Muehlebach's lobby between two businessmen from Tulsa, Oklahoma. The two found two other men and sang their way through a snowstorm that had marooned all four at the hotel. A few weeks later, they convened several like-minded singers at a meeting in Tulsa, and from that the 25,000 member international organization was founded. The two businessmen's original meeting is now commemorated on a plaque in the restored original lobby of the hotel.

== Famous guests ==
During the 1928 Republican National Convention, held across the street at Convention Hall, Herbert Hoover frequented the hotel.

Howard Hughes had the presidential suite during his 1945 stay.

The Muehlebach was the White House headquarters for Harry S. Truman during his frequent visits to his home in nearby Independence, Missouri. Truman stayed in Independence but conducted business in the Presidential Suite in the hotel's penthouse. Truman signed the Truman Doctrine legislation aid for Turkey and Greece at the hotel on May 22, 1947. In the true crime novel In Cold Blood by Truman Capote, killer Dick Hickock claims to have shaken hands with Truman in the lobby during one of his visits.

Truman predicted his upset victory to staffers at the hotel during election night 1948 (although he spent the night out of the media spotlight at the Elms Hotel in Excelsior Springs, Missouri). The Presidential Suite was later renamed the Harry S. Truman Presidential Suite following his terms of office.

Roy O. Disney spent the night in July 1956 before spending the Fourth of July in Marceline, Missouri with his brother Walt.

In 1959, the Society of American Registered Architects (SARA), founded by architect Wilfred Gregson in 1956 with the mission of "Architect Helping Architect", held its first national conference at the Hotel Muehlebach. Gregson reported to those assembled: "You are the ones who have made the first great step toward a unified profession of architects. You are a living report that will go to every part of these fifty United States".

In fall 1974, President Gerald Ford stayed at the Muehlebach when he was in town as the keynote speaker for the National FFA Convention. He shook hands with many of the FFA band members that were standing in a rope line in the lobby. The band members were also staying at the hotel the same week.

During the 1976 Republican National Convention both Gerald Ford and Ronald Reagan made pitches for delegates at the Radisson Muehlebach.

Immediately following the 1976 Republican Convention, Robert A. Heinlein was the Guest of Honor at the 34th World Science Fiction Convention held at the Radisson Muehlebach and the Hotel Phillips, directly across the street. He was booked into the Muehlebach's Harry S. Truman Presidential Suite for the 5-day convention held during the 1976 Labor Day weekend.

Among the other celebrity guests that stayed at the Muehlebach were Babe Ruth, the Beatles, Jimi Hendrix Experience and Elvis Presley.
