= Ramona (vocalist) =

American singer

Estrild Raymona Myers (March 11, 1909 – December 14, 1972), known professionally as Ramona, was an American cabaret and jazz singer and pianist. She was most prominent during the 1930s and best known for her association with Paul Whiteman and his orchestra.

== Biography ==
=== Growing up ===
Ramona was born March 11, 1909, in the Cincinnati suburb of Lockland, Ohio, to teenage parents – Raymond Pendery Myers (1891–1962), who was 17, and Rachel Margaret DeCamp (maiden; 1893–1963), who was 15. Her parents' marriage was annulled before her birth by her paternal grandparents, Herman Jackson Myers (1859–1945) and Jessie Henrietta Pendery (1960–n.a.), though they were unaware that Rachel was pregnant. Rachel and Ramona, when she was still an infant, moved to Ashland, Kentucky, where Rachel met Charles Clifford Payne (1893–1933) and, around 1917, married him. The namesakes for Raymona Estrild were drawn from her father and her maternal grandmother, Estrild "Trillie" DeCamp (né Estrild Riggs; born 1860–1928).

=== Music career ===
When she was twelve, Ramona played piano at a hotel every weekend. She was hired by a radio station in Kansas City as a staff pianist. Three years later moved to Pittsburgh and started singing. Around 1929, she became singer and pianist with Don Bestor and His Orchestra – at the William Penn Hotel in Pittsburgh and on tour, coast-to-coast. She later performed in vaudeville.

Ramona became a vocalist and pianist for Paul Whiteman's Orchestra from 1932 to 1937, succeeding Mildred Bailey. She performed on Whiteman's radio show in 1933, Al Jolson's radio show in 1933–34, and the Kraft Music Hall in late 1934 through early 1935 (before Bing Crosby took over the latter program in 1936). She was featured with the Whiteman band in the 20th Century-Fox 1935 film Thanks a Million. She left Whiteman's band in 1937 and worked as a solo act, recording for Liberty Music Shop Records. In the late 1930s, she led a male big band and recorded for Varsity Records.

== Personal life ==
Ramona was married three times. She first married in 1929 to Howard L. Davies. She then married 1936 to H. Kenyon Hopkins (1912–1983), an arranger for Andre Kostelanetz and Paul Whiteman. They divorced around June 1943. Ramona then married June 14, 1944, to baseball broadcaster Al Helfer, which whom, she had her only child, a daughter, Ramona Margaret Perry (née Ramona Margaret Helfer; 1945–2017), born in Manhattan, New York. Ramona, the mother, remained married to Al Helfer until her death.

=== Death ===
Ramona Davies died of cancer in Sacramento, California on December 14, 1972.

== Discography ==
- Ramona and Her Grand Piano

=== Songs ===
- I Can't Give You Anything But Love, Baby (Jimmy McHugh & Dorothy Fields), recorded September 13, 1935
- I Hate to Think That You'll Grow Old, Baby (Lew Brown & Ray Henderson), March 7, 1933
- The Beat O' My Heart (Harold Spina & Johnny Burke), February 27, 1934
- You Excite Me! (Mitchell Parish & Frank Perkins), August 16, 1933
- Annie Doesn't Live Here Anymore (Harold Spina & Johnny Burke), October 24, 1933
- Broadway's Gone Hill-Billy, Lew Brown & Jay Gorney), March 27, 1934
- Are You Makin' Any Money? (Herman Hupfeld, July 20, 1933
- I Lay Me Down to Sleep, (Allie Wrubel), April 19, 1933
- Not for All the Rice in China (Irving Berlin), October 20, 1933
- A Penny for Your Thoughts (E.Y Harburg & Vernon Duke), March 1, 1933
- Barrel-House Music (Willard Robison) September 13, 1935
- Come Up and See Me Sometime (Louis Alter & Arthur Swanstrom). August 8, 1933
- I'm No Angel (Harvey Brooks, Gladys DuBois, Ben Ellison), October 20, 1933
- I Found a New Way to Go to Town (Harvey Brooks, Gladys DuBois, Ben Ellison), October 20, 1933
- New O'leans (Arthur Lange), July 9, 1935
- Ah, the Moon Is Here (Sammy Fain & Irving Kahal), August 16, 1933
- Tony's Wife (Burton Lane & Harold Adamson), March 7, 1933
- No Strings, (Irving Berlin), September 13, 1935
- Every Now And Then (Abner Silver, Al Sherman, & Al Lewis), September 13, 1935
- We're Out of the Red (Lew Brown & Jay Gorney), March 27, 1934
- Never Had an Education (Irving Caesar & Sigmund Romberg), March 7, 1933
- Raisin' the Rent (Harold Arlen & Ted Koehler), April 20, 1933
- Anything Goes, (Cole Porter), October 26, 1934
- The Heart Is Quicker Than the Eye (Lorenz Hart, Richard Rodgers), April 28, 1936
