= Guy Marks =

American actor, comedian, singer and impressionist

- Guy Marks (c. 1970s)
- Born: Mario Scarpa; October 31, 1923; Philadelphia, Pennsylvania, US
- Died: November 28, 1987 (aged 64); Pomona, New Jersey, US
- Occupations: Actor, comedian, singer, impressionist

Guy Marks (October 31, 1923 – November 28, 1987) was an American actor, comedian, singer and impressionist. A familiar face on TV sitcoms and variety shows of the 1960s and 1970s, he appeared regularly on The Ed Sullivan Show, The Merv Griffin Show, The Dean Martin Show, The Mike Douglas Show, and The Joey Bishop Show. He had a natural gift for mimicry, and his impressions of celebrities such as Humphrey Bogart, Gary Cooper, Boris Karloff, and many others were considered among the best. However, he also could imitate a housefly on a slippery oil cloth, neon signs, alligators, driftwood furniture, rubber bands, frozen chickens, frogs, praying mantis, and — his favorite — an ostrich, all of which found their way into his act or in characters he played on TV.

== Early life ==
Marks was born Mario Scarpa in South Philadelphia, Pennsylvania. He was the youngest of 11 children born to Ermelindo and Adelina Scarpa, who had emigrated from Italy to America at the beginning of the 20th century. Ermelindo was a clarinetist with the RCA recording orchestra under the direction of Josef Pasternack, and went on to name all of his children after the characters in operas. Mario was named after the hero in La Tosca, an opera his mother admired while she was carrying him. Other siblings included Victoria, Yolanda, Gioconda, Mafalda, Alba, Melba, Thenistocles (Domisticles) and Aristides. Two additional older brothers died at ages two and five from scarlet fever. In school he spent most of his time imitating his teachers and frustrating the principal.

Marks enlisted in the US Army on December 12, 1940, and after serving two years, signed up for a six-year stint in the Merchant Marine. He sailed around the world, including stops in Rio de Janeiro (Brazil) and Hong Kong. When he came back to the US, he did various odd jobs, including bus boy, drill press operator, and even selling flowers. He got into show business by pure accident, when some friends pushed him up onto the stage at Palumbo's in South Philadelphia, where he did impressions of W.C. Fields, Wendell Willkie and The Ink Spots. He found a partner and worked as a team under the name The Al Mar Brothers, but they soon fumbled and Marks was back doing more odd jobs. However, he found pickling hams, driving a cab and construction work—his only other options—unfulfilling, so he decided to give New York a try. While in the Big Apple he rented a room with five other guys including fellow South Philadelphians Eddie Fisher, and Al Martino. He began working nightclubs in New York, Atlantic City and Chicago, and by the end of the 1950s Marks, Martino and Fisher were all winners on Arthur Godfrey's Talent Scouts.

== Career ==
Marks made his first appearance on The Ed Sullivan Show on May 29, 1960. From that point on he appeared dozens of times throughout the 1960s and 1970s on popular variety shows. His big break came when he was cast as a regular on the 1962–63 season of The Joey Bishop Show. Marks appeared in the first 19 episodes of the show's second season as Freddy, manager to Bishop's character, when he was suddenly replaced. Newspapers at the time reported conflict between the show's star Bishop and his second banana Marks. Bishop denied it in the press, and many years later would go on to have Marks on his popular late-night talk show.

Marks made a memorable appearance in an episode of Dick Van Dyke in 1963 when he played a love interest for Sally, played by Rose Marie. The episode, entitled "Jilting the Jilter", featured much of Marks' night-club routine at the time. In May 1964, Marks appeared on The Hollywood Palace to perform another of his famous night-club bits, entitled "How The West Was REALLY Won?" The skit featured Marks' flawless imitations of Humphrey Bogart, Gary Cooper, Robert Mitchum and a Native American Indian. In 1965 he guest-starred on two science-fiction programs, My Living Doll and My Favorite Martian. In the latter on an episode called "The Martian's Fair Hobo", Marks plays a hobo named Shorty Smith. The character allowed Marks to show off his talents for imitating animals and inanimate objects, such as foghorns and frogs. He was second banana again, in 1967, when he was featured as the American Indian "Pink Cloud" in the 1967 ABC comedy Western Rango, starring Tim Conway. Despite early favorable reviews, the show lasted only 17 episodes. In 1969 he appeared on an episode of the popular The Ghost & Mrs. Muir sitcom, playing a gangster who sounds a lot like Humphrey Bogart. He ended the decade with an appearance as a thief trying to hold up Lucille Ball on the Here's Lucy show.

Throughout the 1960s and 1970s Marks made frequent appearances on The Dean Martin Show, The Mike Douglas Show, The Joey Bishop Show; on The Merv Griffin Show alone he appeared a total of 15 times over nine years. During this time he also continued to work in night clubs all over the country and in Las Vegas, performing alongside Eddie Fisher, Ann-Margret, Sammy Davis Jr. and Petula Clark. In a 1974 episode of The Odd Couple, he portrayed a late-night horror movie host named Igor, who sounded a lot like Boris Karloff. His only big-screen appearance was in the 1975 film Train Ride to Hollywood, where he was called upon again to imitate Humphrey Bogart. Also in 1975 Marks performed his famous "How The West Was REALLY Won?" routine on The Dean Martin Celebrity Roast to Michael Landon. It was by far the hit of the show, and had host Martin and fellow roaster Don Rickles howling with laughter. In 1977, he starred alongside Billy Barty in a sitcom pilot called Great Day. It told the story of a group of homeless people who contemplate taking jobs to help save their soon-to-be-foreclosed mission. On an episode of Police Woman called "Blind Terror" that aired in 1978, Marks appeared along with Sandra Dee and the show's star, Angie Dickinson. In 1980 he lent his voice along with Rip Taylor to an animated short called Don't Miss the Boat. In 1981 he was working with Lucille Ball again, in the only project she ever directed, the unsold pilot for a sitcom called Bungle Abbey. Marks' final role on TV was a featured one in the 1986–87 sitcom You Again? as Harry, a poker-playing friend to the show's star Jack Klugman.

== Music career ==
Marks attracted international attention with the surprise novelty hit song "Loving You Has Made Me Bananas", which parodied the medleys and other popular music conventions of the big band era. The single first charted in April 1968. It was based on an old night-club routine of Marks, featuring an affected band singer of the radio era broadcasting from a remote Pennsylvania town. The song hit #17 on the Hot Adult Contemporary chart on April 20–27, 1968, and #51 on the Hot 100 on April 27 - May 11, 1968. In Canada, it reached #53 on the RPM charts. A re-release did similarly well in 1978, reaching #25 in the UK Singles Chart. The UK chart showing led to an appearance by Marks on Top of the Pops in May 1978. Two out of the three backing singers accidentally sang "Your father had the shopfitter blues", while the other one correctly sang "Your father had the shipfitter blues."

== Personal life and death ==
Marks was married at least three times, once to Barbara Thomas (1952 to ?) then to a Kathleen(?) (1962–66) and to Judy Marie De Salle (1971 to ?). One of these marriages produced a daughter.

Marks died on November 28, 1987, at the Atlantic City Medical Center-Pomona in Pomona, NJ. At the time he was living in Brigantine, New Jersey.

== Discography ==
=== Album ===
- Loving You Has Made Me Bananas (1968)
- Hollywood Sings as impersonated by Guy Marks

=== Single ===
- "Loving You Has Made Me Bananas" (1968); re-issued (1978)
