= Gus Edwards (vaudevillian) =

American composer, songwriter and film director (1878–1945)

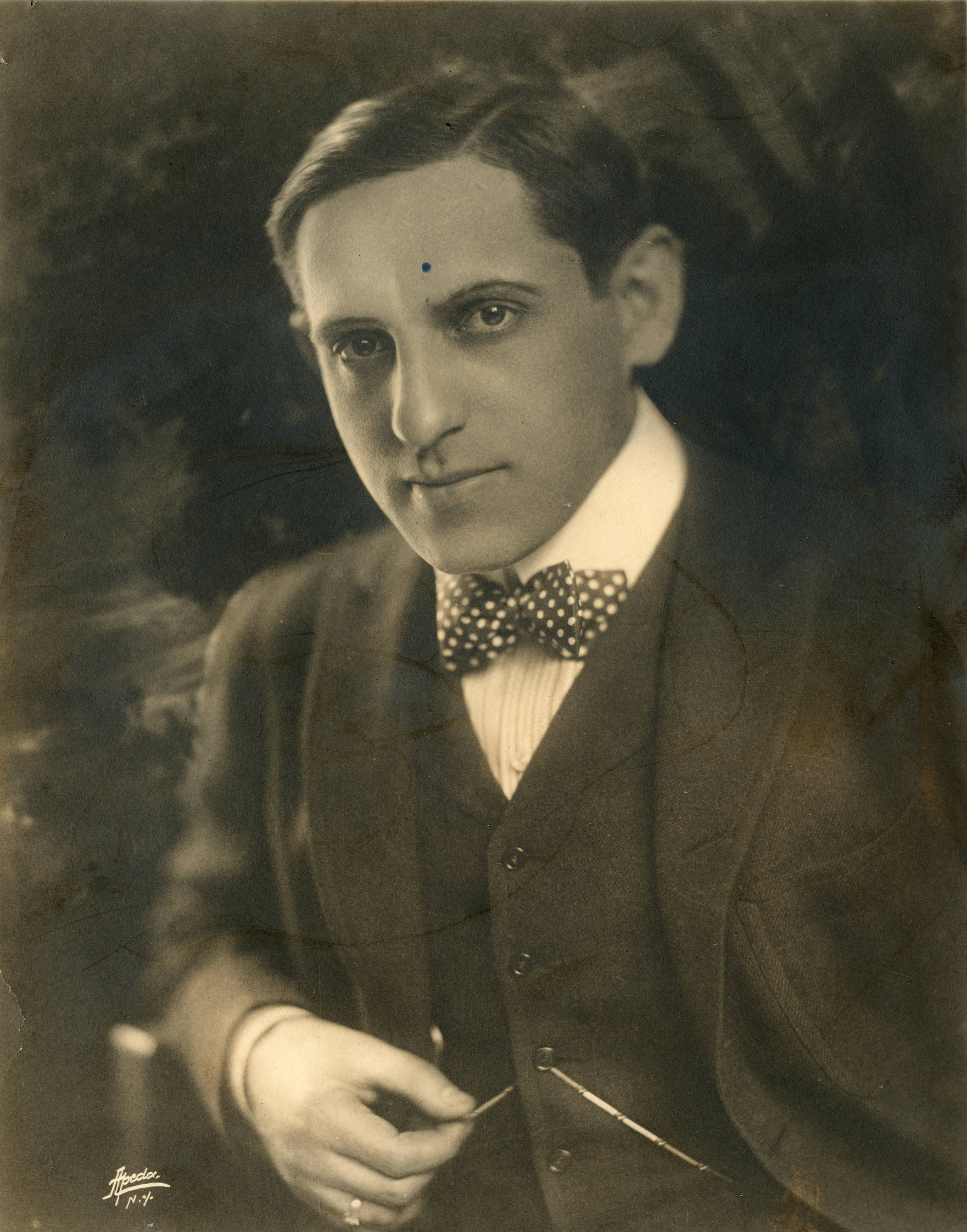
- Edwards in 1919
- Born: Gustav Schmelowsky; August 18, 1878; Inowrazlaw (Inowrocław), German Empire
- Died: November 7, 1945 (aged 67); Los Angeles, California, U.S.
- Resting place: Woodlawn Cemetery
- Occupations: Composer; songwriter; film director
- Spouse: Lillian Boulanger

Gustave Edwards (August 18, 1878 – November 7, 1945) was an American composer, songwriter and film director. He also was a vaudevillian, organized his own theater companies and was a music publisher.

== Early life ==
Edwards was the son of Morris and Johanna Simon. He was born Gustav Schmelowsky in Inowrazlaw, German Empire (present-day Inowrocław, Poland). His family boarded the steamship Spaarndam as steerage passengers; they arrived at the Port of New York on July 29, 1891, ending up in Williamsburg. During the day, he worked in the family cigar store, and in the evenings, he wandered looking for any sort of show business job. He found work as a singer at various lodge halls, on ferry boat lounges, in saloons, and even between bouts at the athletic clubs.

As a very young boy, Edwards worked as a song plugger at Koster and Bial's, at Tony Pastor's theatre, and at the Bowery Theatre. In those old vaudeville days, song publishers would often hire a very young boy to sit in the theatre, and immediately after a vaudeville star had sung one of the publisher's songs, the youngster would stand up in the audience, and pretending to be completely overcome by the song, break out in an "extemporaneous" solo of the same tune. In this way, the young Edwards would often sit in a balcony seat, and then stand and repeat a song that vaudeville stars such as Maggie Cline, Lottie Gilson or Emma Carus had just sung.

== Career ==
In 1896, Edwards was 17 years old and appearing at Johnny Palmer's Gaiety Saloon in Brooklyn, when James Hyde, a vaudeville agent, saw him performing. He booked a tour for Edwards and four other boys as The Newsboys Quintet act. In 1898, while performing in this act, Edwards wrote his first song, to a lyric by Tom Daly, "All I Want is My Black Baby Back".

Edwards could not write music at that time, so he hired Charles Previn to write down the notes. May Irwin sang the song in her act, and helped to popularize it.

While entertaining soldiers at Camp Black, during the Spanish–American War, Edwards met lyricist Will Cobb, and they formed "Words and Music", a partnership that lasted for many years. He was a vaudeville singer, and later had his own vaudeville company. He discovered Walter Winchell, Elsie Janis, George Jessel, Eddie Cantor, Groucho Marx, Phil Silvers, Lila Lee, Georgie Price, Eleanor Powell, Hildegarde, Ray Bolger, Sally Rand, Jack Pearl, the Lane Sisters, and Ina Ray Hutton. He wrote the Broadway stage scores for "When We Were Forty-One", "Hip Hip Hooray", "The Merry-Go-Round", "School Days", "Ziegfeld Follies of 1910", "Sunbonnet Sue", and "Show Window". He founded the Gus Edwards Music Hall in New York, and also his own publishing company, then produced special subjects for films, and returned to vaudeville between 1930 and 1937, finally retiring in 1939. His chief musical collaborators included Edward Madden, Will Cobb, and Robert B. Smith. His other popular-song compositions include "Meet Me Under the Wisteria", "By the Light of the Silvery Moon", "I Can't Tell You Why I Love You but I Do", "Goodbye, Little Girl, Goodbye", "I Just Can't Make My Eyes Behave", "I'll Be With You When the Roses Bloom Again", "He's My Pal", "Way Down Yonder in the Cornfield", "In Zanzibar", "If a Girl Like You Loved a Boy Like Me", "Jimmy Valentine", "If I Were a Millionaire", "Laddie Boy" and "In My Merry Oldsmobile".

Some other songs include "America Never Took Water and America Never Will", "Au Revoir", "Good Bye and Luck Be with You Laddie Boy", "He Long and Lean and Lanky", "Keep on A-Going", "Mothers of Men" and "My Rainbow Ribbon Girl".

=== Radio ===
In the 1930s, Edwards had a weekly program, School Days of the Air, on KFWB in Los Angeles, California.

=== Family ===
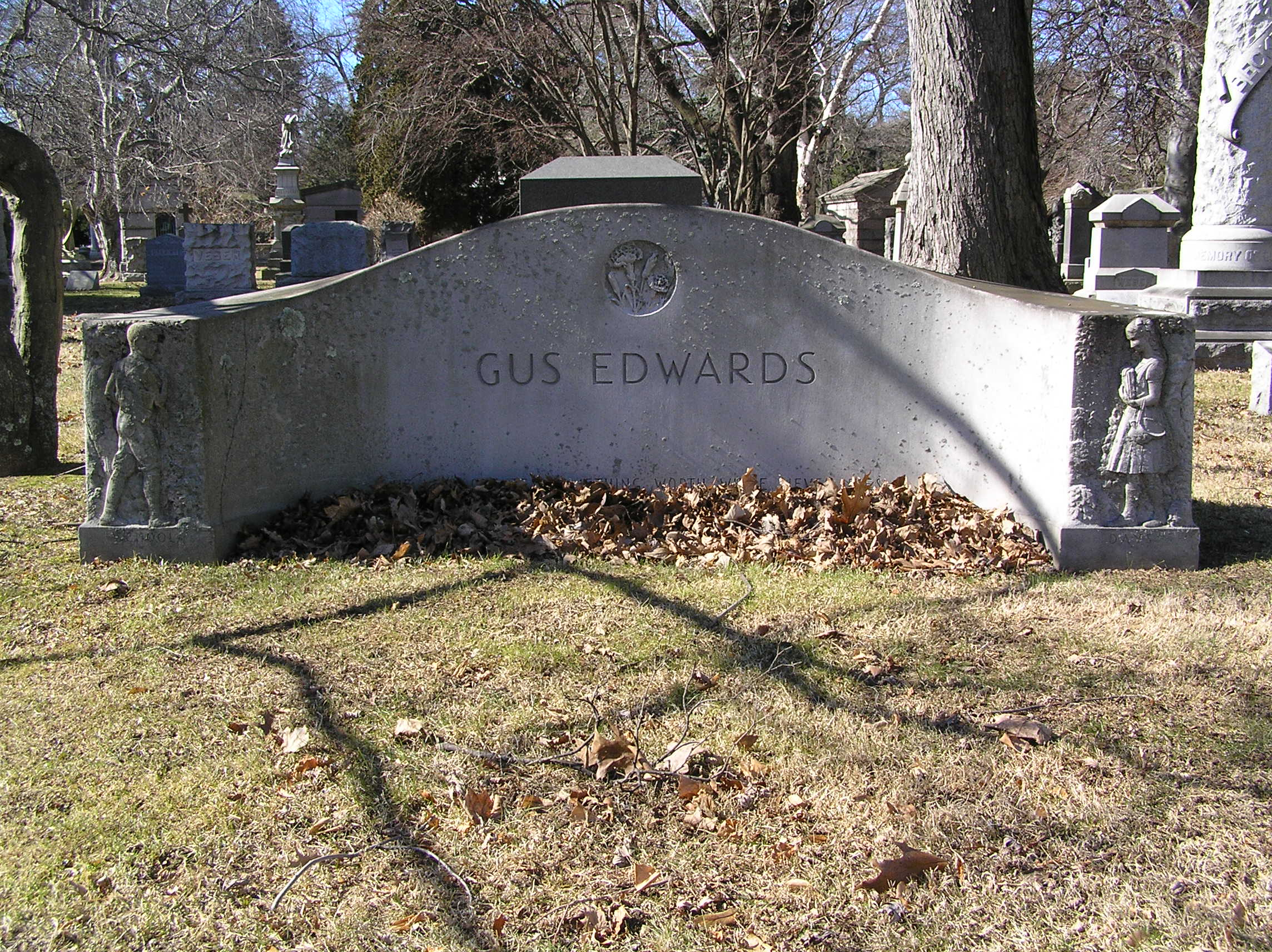
The gravesite of Gus Edwards in Woodlawn Cemetery

Edwards was the brother of composer Leo Edwards, music publisher and talent agent Ben Edwards, and vaudeville singer Dorothea Edwards. He was the uncle of Joan Edwards and Jack Edwards.

=== Film ===
Bing Crosby played Edwards in a fictionalized version of his life in the 1939 film The Star Maker, directed by Roy Del Ruth. Edwards himself made few screen appearances, the most notable being The Hollywood Revue of 1929, in which he performs as part of a vaudeville act. He also wrote all the music for The Hollywood Revue of 1929, as credited in the closing credits of the production, with the exception of "Singin' in the Rain" with lyrics by Arthur Freed and music by Nacio Herb Brown. He also performs a specialty number: "Lon Chaney's Gonna Get You If You Don't Watch Out".

=== Recognition ===
Edwards was a founding member of ASCAP in 1914 and was inducted into the Songwriters Hall of Fame in 1970.

== Personal life and death ==
Edwards was married to the former Lillian Boulanger, who worked with him in putting on revues and cultivating performers. He died of a heart attack in Hollywood, Los Angeles, California, on November 7, 1945, aged 66. He was buried in Woodlawn Cemetery.

== Broadway works ==
Note: All shows are musicals unless otherwise stated.

- Hodge, Podge & Co. (1900) - featured songwriter
- The Wizard of Oz (1903) - interpolated songs with Will D. Cobb
  - "Rosalie"
  - "I Love Only One Girl in the Wide, Wide World"
  - "The Tale of a Cassowary"
  - "Johnnie I'll Take You"
  - "I'll Never Love Another Love Like I Love You"
- The Medal and the Maid (1904) - featured composer for "In Zanzibar"
- When We Were Forty-one (1905) - composer (for twelve out of fourteen numbers)
- Breaking Into Society (1905) - co-composer and co-lyricist
- His Honor the Mayor (1906) - contributing composer and lyricist
  - Revived again in 1906, twice in 1907
- The Blue Moon (1906) - featured composer for "(Don't You Think It's) Time to Marry"
- A Parisian Model (1906) - featured co-songwriter for "I (Just) Can't Make My Eyes Behave"
  - Revived in 1908
- Ziegfeld Follies of 1907 (1907) - revue - featured composer for "That's What the Rose Said to Me" and "On the Grand Old Sands"
- The Hired Girl's Millions (1907) - featured songwriter for "Where the River Shannon Flows"
- Hip! Hip! Hooray! (1907) - composer
- The-Merry-Go-Round (1908) - composer (for all but three numbers)
- School Days (1908) - composer, co-lyricist, producer
- Miss Innocence (1908) - featured composer and lyricist for "What Kind of a Wife to Choose (What Kind of a Wife Does a Man Like Best)"
- Ziegfeld Follies of 1909 (1909) - revue - featured composer for "My Cousin Caruso (from Miss Innocence)" from Miss Innocence and "Up! Up! Up! in My Aeroplane"
- Ziegfeld Follies of 1910 (1910) - revue - co-bookwriter and featured composer for "Look Me Over Carefully (and Tell Me Will I Do)", "Sweet Kitty Bellairs", "Kidland", "Our American Colleges", "In the Evening (In de Evenin')", "The Black Cat", "A Woman's Dream", "Mr. Earth and His Comet Love (The Comet and the Earth)" and "The Waltzing Lieutenant"
- Broadway Sho-Window (1936) - revue - composer, producer and director

Posthumously:

- Tintypes (1980) - revue - featured songwriter

== Filmography ==
- Climbing the Golden Stairs (1929) - Director
