= On the Boardwalk with Paul Whiteman =

American TV musical series (1954)

- Presented by: Paul Whiteman
- Country of origin: United States
- Original language: English

Production
- Production locations: Steel Pier, Atlantic City, New Jersey
- Running time: 60 minutes

Original release
- Network: ABC
- Release: May 30 – August 1, 1954

On the Boardwalk with Paul Whiteman is an American talent show that aired live on ABC on Sunday night from May 30, 1954, to August 1, 1954, hosted by Paul Whiteman.

== Overview ==
Telecast live from the Steel Pier in Atlantic City, New Jersey, the program featured eight young performers during the first half hour who were then rated by a panel of four show business people. The four performers who ranked highest would then return the following week to perform again after having a week of professional coaching.

== Production ==
Bernie Lowe was the musical director. The program was broadcast on Sundays from 8 to 9 p.m. Eastern Time.
