= Leo Edwards (composer) =

Leo Edwards (21 February 1886 – 12 July 1978) was a Broadway and Tin Pan Alley composer and pianist. He worked closely with Florenz Ziegfeld Jr., writing music for the Ziegfeld Follies for over a decade. He also wrote music for Paul Whiteman and collaborated with his two brothers, the composer Gus Edwards and music publisher and talent agent Ben Edwards, in addition to writing music for several New York music publishing firms.

== Life and career ==
Born Leo Schmelowsky in Posen, Germany, Leo Edwards was the brother of composer and vaudeville musician Gus Edwards, music publisher and talent agent Ben Edwards, and vaudeville songstress Dorothea Edwards. His brother Ben had a famous daughter, the singer and song writer Joan Edwards. In 1891 he traveled to the United States with his family on the steamship Spaarndam; arriving at the Port of New York on 29 July 1891. The family settled in the Williamsburg neighborhood of Brooklyn.

Leo Edwards worked for music publishing firms as a staff composer; writing music for T. B. Harms, M. Witmark & Sons, the Gus Edwards Music Company, Leo Feist Inc., and the DeSylva Publishing Company. In 1914 he was a charter member of the American Society of Composers, Authors and Publishers. His Broadway credits as a composer include The Wizard of Oz (1902), The Blue Paradise, The Merry Whirl (1911), and the Ziegfeld Follies of 1912, 1913, 1915, 1916, 1917, 1921 and 1923.

Edwards co-wrote the popular song "My Fantasy" with Paul Whiteman and Jack Meskill, which is an adaptation of the Polovtsian Dances theme from the opera Prince Igor by Alexander Borodin. He also wrote "I'm an Indian" for Fanny Brice. His other notable songs include "Isle d' Amour"; "Sweetheart, Let's Grow Old Together"; "My Fantasy"; "That's What the Rose Said to Me"; "Little Seeds of Kindness"; "So Long, Good Bye"; "If They Don't Stop Making Them So Beautiful"; "Waiting for the Dawn and You"; and "Let's Grow Old Together". Some of his other collaborators in song writing included Earl Carroll, Blanche Merrill, and Herbert Reynolds.

Edwards was married to Olga Edwards who was a singer with Paul Whiteman. She died in 1940 at the age of 46. His second wife, Gertrude Edwards, died in 1965.

Edwards lived at the Olcott Hotel in New York City. He died there at the age of 92 in 1978.
