= Flamin' Mamie =

1925 jazz song

1925 sheet music cover, "Flamin' Mamie", Leo Feist, NY.

"Flamin' Mamie" is a 1925 jazz classic composed by Paul Whiteman and Fred Rose.

Paul Whiteman wrote "Flamin' Mamie" in 1925 with Fred Rose as a "Fox Trot Song" on Jazz Age themes relying on the 1920s image of the vamp: "A Red Hot Stepper". It was one of the top hits of 1925.

== Recordings ==
The song was recorded by the Harry Reser Band, Merritt Brunies and the Friars Inn Orchestra, Billy Jones and Ernest Hare, the Six Black Diamonds in 1926 on Banner, also released as by Perry's Hot Dogs on Domino, the Toll House Jazz Band, Aileen Stanley in 1925 with Billy "Uke" Carpenter on the ukulele, Turk Murphy, the Frisco Syncopators, the Firehouse Five Plus Two, Ray Pearl and His Orchestra in 1947 on Bullet Records as a 78, 1007A, Bob Schulz and His Frisco Jazz Band, and the Coon-Sanders Nighthawk Orchestra led by Carleton Coon and Joe Sanders with Joe Sanders on vocals. Mike Markels' Orchestra released a version on Brunswick with Miff Mole. Alex Mendham and his Orchestra have performed the song in concert in 2014.

The lyrics describe Mamie as a Roaring Twenties vamp: "Flamin' Mamie, a sure-fire vamp/When it comes to lovin'/She's a human oven/Come on you futuristic papas/She's the hottest thing he's seen since the Chicago fire."

Willie Dixon wrote a song with the same title in 1977 with Penny Page whose copyright was registered on August 9, 1979, that uses the same themes and lyrics as the Paul Whiteman and Fred Rose song without acknowledgement.

Hank Penny and his Radio Cowboys released a song by the same name in 1938 released on Vocalion which lists Fred Rose and Paul Whiteman as the composers. A release in 1946 on King, however, lists Rex Martin as the writer.

1925 Victor release by Aileen Stanler, 19828-A.

== Sources ==
- Berrett, Joshua (2004). Louis Armstrong & Paul Whiteman: Two Kings of Jazz. Yale University Press, p. 123. ISBN 978-0-300-10384-7.
- Paul Whiteman: Pioneer of American Music (Volume 1: 1890–1930), Studies in Jazz, No. 43, by Don Rayno, The Scarecrow Press, Inc., 2003.
- Pops: Paul Whiteman, King of Jazz, by Thomas A. DeLong, New Century Publishers, 1983.
- Jazz by Paul Whiteman, J. H. Sears, 1926.
- How To Be A Band Leader by Paul Whiteman and Leslie Lieber, Robert McBride & Company, 1948.
