= Ben Edwards (music publisher) =

Ben Edwards (c. 1884 – June 17, 1954) was an American music publisher and long-time vaudeville talent agent of German birth.

== Life and career ==
Born Benjamin Schmelowsky in Posen, Germany, Ben Edwards was the brother of songwriters Leo Edwards and Gus Edwards, and vaudeville songstress Dorothea Edwards. In 1891 he traveled to the United States with his family on the steamship Spaarndam, arriving at the Port of New York on 29 July 1891. The family settled in the Williamsburg neighborhood of Brooklyn.

Ben Edwards served as his older brother Gus's agent and publisher; managing the Gus Edwards Music Company for fourteen years and booking his brother for vaudeville performances. He expanded into managing the careers of other top vaudeville acts in addition to booking gigs for his other siblings; becoming one of the top vaudeville bookers of the 1910s, 1920s and 1930s.

Edwards died in New York City at the Flower Fifth Avenue Hospital in 1954 at the age of 70. He was married to Ethel Edwards. Their daughter was the singer and songwriter Joan Edwards.
