= Charlestonette =

1925 jazz composition by Paul Whiteman and Fred Rose

- Jazz song by Paul Whiteman and Fred Rose
- 1925 sheet music cover, Leo Feist, New York
- Genre: Jazz
- Style: Foxtrot
- Form: Dance song
- Published: 1925: New York
- Publisher: Leo Feist
- Recorded: September 16, 1925: New York

"Charlestonette" is a 1925 jazz composition by jazz musician and bandleader Paul Whiteman and Fred Rose. The song was released as a 78 single by Paul Whiteman and His Orchestra.

== Background ==
The composition was published by Leo Feist in New York. Paul Whiteman recorded the song on September 16, 1925 in New York. The song was released as Victor 19785 backed with "Ida-I Do" in 1925 by Paul Whiteman and His Orchestra. Ben Selvin's Dance Orchestra and Bennie Krueger and His Orchestra, as Brunswick 2948, also recorded the song in 1925.

On the original Victor 78 release, Paul Whiteman's name does not appear on the songwriting credit. Only Fred Rose is credited. On the sheet music published by Leo Feist, however, both Whiteman and Rose are credited as the songwriters.

== Personnel ==
- Alto Saxophone, Baritone Saxophone – Charles Strickfaden
- Alto Saxophone, Bass Clarinet, Clarinet – Chester Hazlett
- Alto Saxophone, Clarinet – Hal McLean
- Banjo – Mike Pingitore or Pingatore
- Clarinet, Tenor Saxophone – E. Lyle Sharpe
- Drums – George Marsh
- Leader, Violin – Paul Whiteman
- Piano Accordion – Mario Perry
- Piano – Harry Perrella
- Trombone – Roy Maxon, Wilbur Hall
- Trumpet – Frank D. Siegrist, Henry Busse, Ted Bartell
- Tuba – John Sperzel
- Violin – Charles Gaylord

== Sources ==
- Paul Whiteman: Pioneer of American Music (Volume 1: 1890–1930), Studies in Jazz, No. 43, by Don Rayno, The Scarecrow Press, Inc., 2003.
- Pops: Paul Whiteman, King of Jazz, by Thomas A. DeLong, New Century Publishers, 1983.
- Jazz by Paul Whiteman, J. H. Sears, 1926.
- How To Be A Band Leader by Paul Whiteman and Leslie Lieber, Robert McBride & Company, 1948.
