= Fred Rose (songwriter) =

American music producer, publisher and songwriter (1898–1954)

- Born: Knowles Fred Rose; August 24, 1898; Evansville, Indiana, U.S.
- Died: December 1, 1954 (aged 56) Nashville, Tennessee, U.S.
- Genres: Country, pop
- Occupations: Musician, producer, songwriter, music publisher
- Instrument: Piano

Knowles Fred Rose (August 24, 1898 – December 1, 1954) was an American musician, Hall of Fame songwriter, and music publishing executive.

== Biography ==
Born in Evansville, Indiana, United States, Rose started playing piano and singing as a small boy. In his teens, he moved to Chicago, Illinois where he worked in bars busking for tips, and finally vaudeville. He became successful as a songwriter, penning his first hit for entertainer Sophie Tucker.

Rose lived in Nashville, Tennessee, but his radio show there did not last long and he went New York City's Tin Pan Alley to be a songwriter. He wrote songs with Ray Whitley, an RKO B-Western film star and author of "Back in the Saddle Again", a collaboration that introduced Rose to country music. He lived for a time with Ray and Kay Whitley in an apartment in Hollywood, co-writing many tunes for Ray's movies.

In 1942, Rose returned to Nashville and teamed with Grand Ole Opry star Roy Acuff to create the first Nashville-based music publishing company. Their Acuff-Rose Music was almost immediately successful, particularly with the enormous hits of client Hank Williams. Acuff-Rose Music remained a foundation of the country music business even after Rose's death; his son, Wesley Rose, took over the presidency and continued with Roy Acuff until 1985, when the company's catalog was sold to Gaylord Entertainment Company, parent company of the Grand Ole Opry.

Rose served as Hank Williams' record producer throughout his career, 1947–1953.

While running the business, Rose continued to write numerous country songs and eventually became one of the industry's most important personalities. He also wrote songs under the name Floyd Jenkins.

Rose died in Nashville from a heart attack in 1954 and was interred there in the Mount Olivet Cemetery.

Along with Hank Williams and the "Father of Country Music", Jimmie Rodgers, Rose was one of the first three inductees of the Country Music Hall of Fame when it opened in 1961. He was inducted into the Nashville Songwriters Hall of Fame in 1970 and into the Songwriters Hall of Fame in 1985. In 1986, son Wesley would join his father in the Country Music Hall of Fame.

== Selected list of Fred Rose songs ==
- "A Pair of Broken Hearts" (Rose/Carson) – Hank Snow
- "At Mail Call Today" (Rose/Autry) – Gene Autry
- "Be Honest with Me" (Rose/Autry) – Gene Autry
- "Blue Eyes Crying in the Rain" (Rose) – Roy Acuff, Willie Nelson, Olivia Newton-John, Hank Williams (on Mothers Best Show), Alain Bashung
- "Blue Love (In My Heart)" (Floyd Jenkins) – Hank Williams
- "Charlestonette" (Rose/Whiteman) – Paul Whiteman and His Orchestra
- "Crazy Heart" (Rose/Maurice Murray) – Hank Williams
- "'Deed I Do" (Rose/Walter Hirsch) – Sophie Tucker
- "Deep Henderson" (Rose) – Joe "King" Oliver, The Ipana Troubadors, Coon-Sanders Original Nighthawk Orchestra
- "Deep Water (Rose) – Bob Wills, Carl Smith, George Strait, Don Everly
- "Dreaming the Waltz Away" (Rose/Whiteman) – Jesse Crawford
- "Faded Love and Winter Roses" (Rose) – Carl Smith, Hank Williams, David Houston
- "Fireball Mail" (Floyd Jenkins) – Roy Acuff, Wanda Jackson
- "Flamin' Mamie" (Rose/Whiteman) – Coon-Sanders Orchestra, Aileen Stanley
- "Foggy River" (Rose) – Moon Mullican, Red Foley, Carl Smith
- "Hang Your Head in Shame" (Rose/Ed G. Nelson/Steve Nelson) – Bob Wills, Red Foley
- "Home In San Antone" (Rose) – Bob Wills, Ray Price, Moe Bandy
- "I Can't Go On This Way" (Rose) – Bob Wills
- "I'll Never Get Out of This World Alive" (Rose/Williams) – Hank Williams
- "I Hang My Head And Cry" (Rose) Gene Autry, Marty Robbins, Hank Williams (on the Mother's Best Show)
- "It's a Sin" (Rose/Grishaw) – Eddy Arnold
- "Kaw-Liga" (Rose/Williams) – Hank Williams, Hank Williams, Jr., Carl Perkins, Charley Pride, Del Shannon, Jayke Orvis & the Broken Band,
- "No One Will Ever Know" (Rose/Mel Foree) – Marty Robbins, Gene Watson, Hank Williams, Jerry Lee Lewis
- "Pins and Needles (In My Heart)" (Floyd Jenkins) – Bob Atcher and Bonnie Blue Eyes, Darrell McCall, Hank Williams (on Mothers Best Show)
- "Red Hot Henry Brown" (Rose) – The Charleston Chasers, Margaret Young
- "Red Hot Mama" (Rose/Wells Gilbert/Bud Cooper) – Sophie Tucker, Cliff Edwards
- "Roly Poly" (Rose) – Bob Wills, Carl Smith, Hank Williams, Jim Reeves
- "Settin' the Woods on Fire" (Rose/Ed G. Nelson) – Hank Williams, Johnny Burnette
- "Take These Chains From My Heart" (Rose/Heath) – Hank Williams
- "Texarkana Baby" (Rose/Clark) – Eddy Arnold, Bob Wills
- "Waltz of the Wind" (Rose) – Roy Acuff, Carl Smith, Hank Locklin, Marty Robbins, Hank Williams
