= When the One You Love Loves You =

1924 jazz song by Paul Whiteman

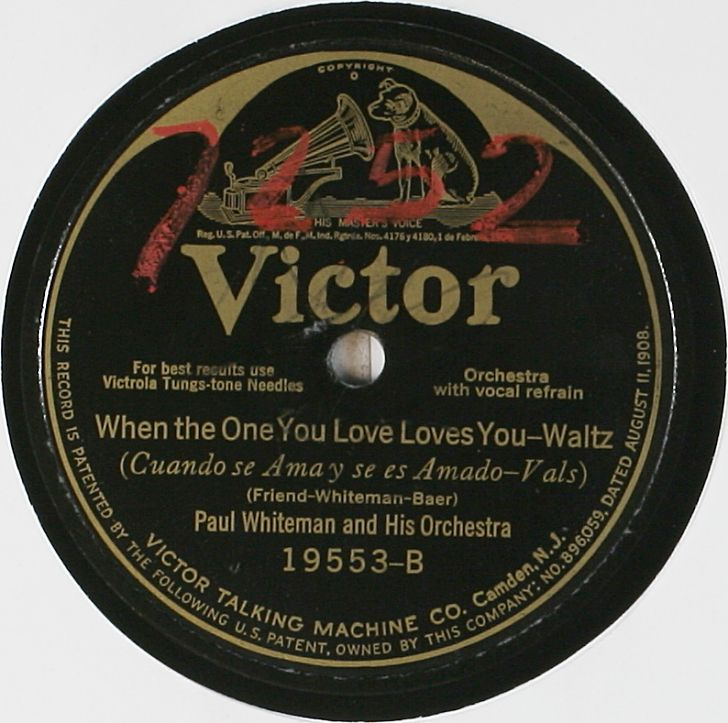
1925 Victor 78 release, 19553B

"When the One You Love Loves You" is a 1924 composition by American jazz musician and bandleader Paul Whiteman. The song was released as a 78 single by Paul Whiteman and His Orchestra.

== Background ==
Paul Whiteman composed the song with Abel Baer and lyricist Cliff Friend. Whiteman recorded the song on 24 December 1924 in New York City with Franklyn Baur on vocals and released it as Victor 19553-B backed with "I'll See You in My Dreams". The single reached #7 on the Billboard national pop singles charts in April 1925, staying on the charts for 3 weeks. The song is described as "A Sentimental Waltz Ballad" on the 1925 sheet music.

== Other recordings ==
Singer and composer Morton Downey, Sr., the father of the talk show host, recorded the song in 1925 and released it as Brunswick 2887. Eva Shirley sang the song in Ed Wynn's Grab Bag, a Broadway musical which opened in 1924 at the Globe. Leo Feist published the sheet music for the Shirley version in 1924 featuring Eva Shirley on the cover.

1925 sheet music cover featuring Morton Downey, Feist, New York. "Sung by Morton Downey with Paul Whiteman and his Orchestra."

== Sources ==
- Paul Whiteman: Pioneer of American Music (Volume 1: 1890–1930), Studies in Jazz, No. 43, by Don Rayno, The Scarecrow Press, Inc., 2003.
- Pops: Paul Whiteman, King of Jazz, by Thomas A. DeLong, New Century Publishers, 1983.
- Jazz by Paul Whiteman, J. H. Sears, 1926.
- How To Be A Band Leader by Paul Whiteman and Leslie Lieber, Robert McBride & Company, 1948.
