= Joan Edwards (radio singer) =

American actress and singer (1919–1981)

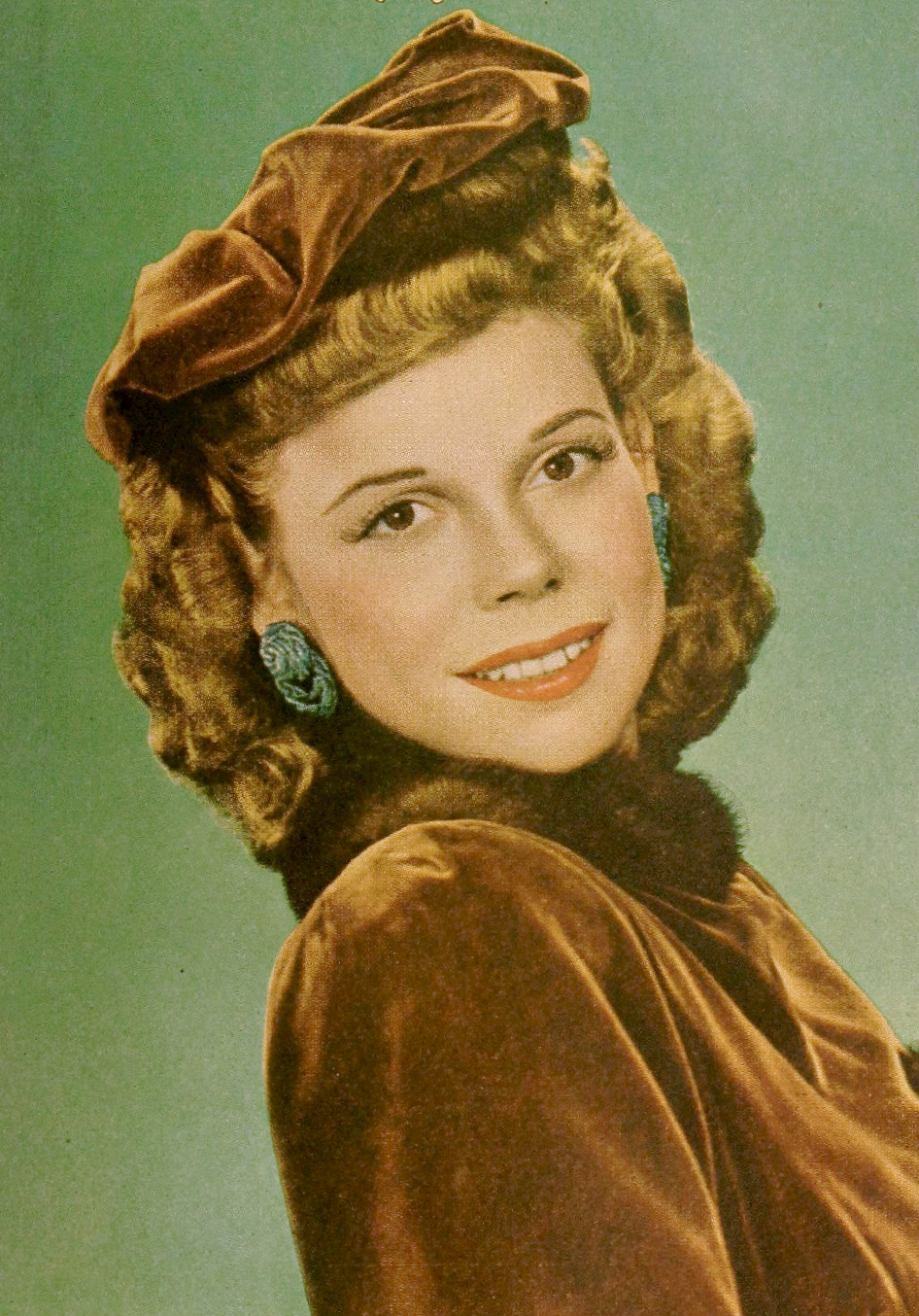
- Edwards in 1945
- Born: February 13, 1919; New York City, New York, U.S.
- Died: August 27, 1981 (aged 62); New York City, New York, U.S.
- Education: Hunter College
- Occupation: Singer
- Spouse: Julius Schachter
- Children: 3 daughters, 1 son
- Father: Ben Edwards

Joan Edwards (February 13, 1919 – August 27, 1981) was an American film actress and singer-songwriter in the old-time radio era. She was perhaps best known for her work on the radio version of Your Hit Parade. She also was a vocalist for Paul Whiteman and his Orchestra.

== Early years ==
Edwards' father was Ben Edwards, a music publisher and talent agent. Music ran in her family; uncle Gus Edwards was a vaudeville entertainer, uncle Leo Edwards wrote music, and aunt Dorothy Edwards was a vocal teacher. Despite the family's show business background, she was urged to go in a different direction. In fact, Gus Edwards told her, "Stay out of show business."

As a child, Edwards had a heart murmur, and doctors advised her to start playing the piano "to keep her busy outside of school hours." She graduated from George Washington High School in Manhattan, where she directed the glee club. She went on to major in music at Hunter College, planning to be a teacher. However, her interest in singing and playing the piano won out, leading to a career in music.

== Radio ==
Edwards' early appearances on radio came "via small stations in New York City." Her first network appearance was on Fred Allen's program.

Beginning March 3, 1941, Edwards had her own program, Girl About Town, on CBS. The 15-minute show was broadcast Wednesdays and Fridays at 10:30 p.m. Eastern time. Although her singing was featured, she played the piano for one song in each episode.

In December 1941, Edwards was selected as the new female soloist on Your Hit Parade. Three years later, an article in Tune In magazine observed, "Joan Edwards sets something of a record, lasting through the regimes of three male singers -- Barry Wood, [Frank] Sinatra, [Lawrence] Tibbett -- in a three-year period." Her tenure on the program eventually reached five years, and the list of male singers' names grew to include Dick Todd and Johnny Mercer. She was dropped from Your Hit Parade in 1947 when the sponsor, American Tobacco Company, changed format, using guest stars rather than regular soloists.

Edwards was a regular on The Danny Kaye Show and on Songs for Sale. She was also heard on George Jessel's program, Duffy's Tavern, Here's to Romance, and Swing Session,

On March 3, 1952, Edwards began a morning disc jockey program on WCBS-AM in New York City.

== Television ==
Edwards had her own program, The Joan Edwards Show, on the DuMont Television Network in 1950. The 15-minute program was broadcast on Tuesday and Thursday nights at 7:45 p.m. A review in the trade publication Variety called Edwards "a capable singer" with "a well-tailored presentation backed by good camera work." She also was seen in an experimental TV version of her Girl About Town radio program in 1941, which was broadcast by CBS on its New York station WCBW.

== Personal appearances ==
Edwards' first job after finishing at Hunter College was performing with Rudy Vallee. Her guest appearance on his radio program was so successful that she toured the United States with Vallee and his orchestra for eight months. She also appeared with bandleader Paul Whiteman and with her uncle, vaudevillian Gus Edwards. A December 6, 1941, newspaper article reported that she had "played the leading vaudeville theaters in the country." In the early 1940s, she also was "appearing at one of Broadway's top night clubs."

In 1942, Edwards performed at the Copley-Plaza hotel in Boston, Massachusetts, with what one newspaper columnist called "the year's most unusual night-club contract." The time off was reserved so that she could fly to New York City to perform on Your Hit Parade on Saturdays. In 1950, she appeared on stage at the Capitol Theatre in a show with bandleader Russ Morgan and others.

== Film ==
Edwards appeared in Hit Parade of 1947.

== Composing ==
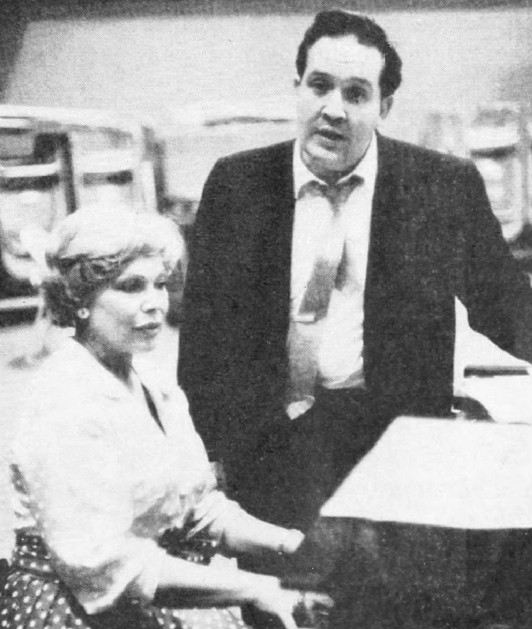
Jingle writers Edwards and Lyn Duddy at work in 1960.

Edwards was co-composer of the Broadway musical Tickets, Please! (1950). She also "wrote scores for nightclub revues as well as many successful advertising jingles." Edwards and Lyn Duddy wrote the songs for Arthur Godfrey's songbook Arthur Godfrey's TV Calendar Songs, published 1953.

== Personal life ==
Edwards was married to Julius Schachter, a violinist who died in 1976. They had three daughters and one son.

== Death ==
Edwards died in Manhattan, New York, of an apparent heart attack, August 27, 1981.

== Partial discography ==
- When I Go a Dreamin' - with Paul Whiteman, 1938 (Decca 2076)
- Moon Love/To You - with Paul Whiteman, 1939 (Decca 2578)
- My Fantasy - with Paul Whiteman, 1940 (Decca 2937)
- Darn It, Baby, That's Love - with Johnnie Johnston, 1950 (MGM 10711)
