= George Muehlebach Brewing Company =

The George Muehlebach Brewing Company ( /ˈmjuːlbɑːk/) was a brewery that operated in Kansas City, Missouri, from 1868 until 1956, when it was acquired by Schlitz. Schlitz eventually discontinued the brand, and its Kansas City brewery was shut down in 1973. At one time, Muehlebach was the largest brewery in the Kansas City area.

The Muehlebach family also founded the Muehlebach Hotel, Kansas City headquarters for Harry S. Truman during his presidency, and Muehlebach Field, which became Municipal Stadium for the Kansas City Athletics and Kansas City Royals baseball teams and the Kansas City Chiefs football team.

George Muehlebach immigrated to Kansas City from Switzerland in 1859 by way of Lafayette, Indiana. The Swiss cross was to be part of the logo for all their beers. In 1869, he bought the city's Main Street Brewery located at the northwest corner of 18th and Main Streets, from George Hierbe. The TWA Building would eventually occupy the site. In 1880, Muehlebach razed the original brewery and replaced it with a "Beer Castle", built in Romanesque style with a mansard roofed tower.

During Prohibition, the company sold non-alcoholic "Mulo", a malt cereal beverage and near beer, as a soft drink. In 1938 after prohibition, Muehlebach built a new brewery at 4th and Oak Streets in the City Market area. Interest in the beer exploded during World War II, when sales rose from 66,000 barrels a year to 161,000.

Schlitz took over the new brewery in 1956 and eventually discontinued the brand in 1973, when it also closed the former Muehlebach brewery.

== Brands ==
- Muehlebach Pilsener
- Muehlebach Special Beer
- Muehlebach Lager Beer
- Malt Liquor by Muehlebach
- Kroysen
- San Miquel
