= Climbing the Golden Stairs =

1929 film

- Directed by: Gus Edwards
- Written by: Fred Niblo Jr. (scenario); Earl Baldwin (dialogue)
- Produced by: Harry Rapf
- Starring: Charles King
- Cinematography: John Arnold
- Edited by: Daniel J. Gray
- Distributed by: Metro-Goldwyn-Mayer
- Release date: August 3, 1929
- Running time: 18 minutes
- Country: United States
- Language: English

Climbing the Golden Stairs is an American 2-reel musical fantasy short released in 1929. It was produced in 2-color Technicolor dye-transfer process.

== Production ==
Production of Climbing the Golden Stairs took place December 2–16, 1928, for a production cost of $40,225.78. 15,925 feet of Technicolor negative was consumed by the production's cameras. The film stars Charles King, who had just appeared in the landmark musical feature The Broadway Melody and would make his second feature, Chasing Rainbows.

== Release ==
Copyright of Climbing the Golden Stairs was registered on March 11, 1929, and it was positively reviewed in trade magazines over the next couple of months, but did not go into general release until early August of that year.

== Preservation ==
Archived film elements for Climbing the Golden Stairs no longer appear to exist, though the second of two sound discs for the production is in the collection of the National Library of Australia.
