= Teddy Roy =

American jazz musician

Theodore Gerald Roy (April 9, 1905, Du Quoin, Illinois - August 31, 1966, New York City) was an American jazz pianist.

Roy played cornet before switching to piano. He played in the Coon-Sanders Original Nighthawk Orchestra and with Jean Goldkette and Frankie Trumbauer early in his career. While in Boston in 1933, he played with Bobby Hackett and Pee Wee Russell, then led his own band in Massachusetts in 1934. Following this, he worked in various dance bands in New York City in the late 1930s and early 1940s.

He served in the Army from 1943 to 1945, then played with Max Kaminsky and the new version of the Original Dixieland Jazz Band with Eddie Edwards and Wild Bill Davison. From 1946 to 1959, he played mostly freelance in New York City and on Long Island; among those he played with were Russell, Kaminsky, Miff Mole, and Wingy Manone. He also did solo work in the 1950s.
