= Trianon Ballrooms =

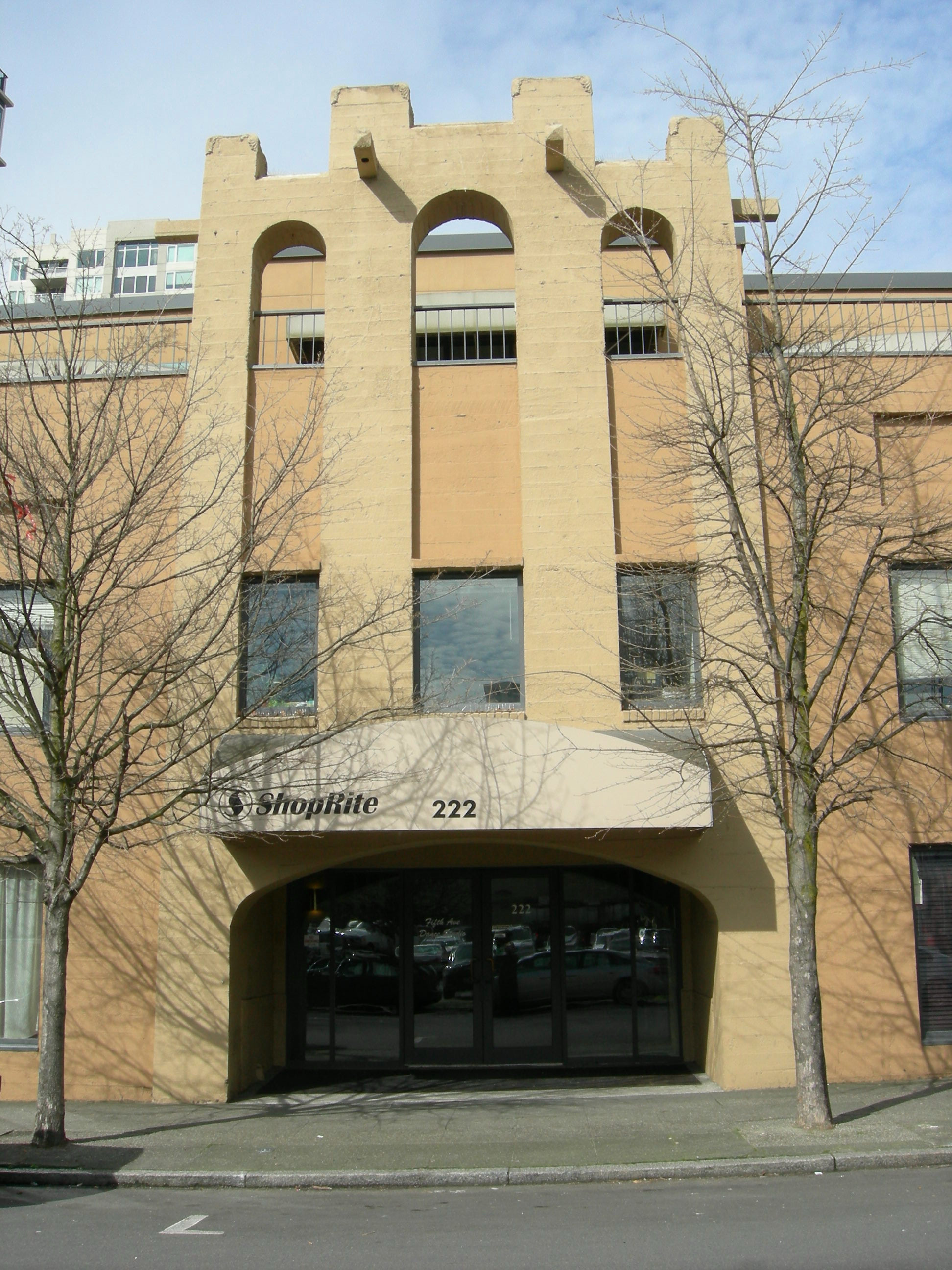
Trianon Building (the former Trianon Ballroom), Belltown, Seattle, Washington.

The Trianon Ballroom was the name given to a number of ballrooms in cities during America's big-band era. The first and most prominent Trianon opened December 6, 1922 in the Woodlawn neighborhood of Chicago, Illinois, and was marketed as "The World's Most Beautiful Ballroom". Designed by renowned theater architects Rapp & Rapp, it was owned and operated by William and Andrew Karzas, who opened the Aragon Ballroom in Chicago four years later. Its name and decor were inspired by the Trianon palace at Versailles. The main ballroom was 100 by 140 feet and was reported to accommodate 3,000 dancers, and the venue was one of the few places in Chicago that was air-conditioned at that time. To ensure that its guests befitted the elegant surroundings, it was the first venue in Chicago to enact a strict dress code, coats and ties for men and gowns for women, with "floor men" to enforce appropriate dress and behavior.

The Trianon's size, opulence and success led to other ballrooms to be similarly named in identifying with the original. Cleveland, Philadelphia, Seattle, Toledo, and the Los Angeles suburb of South Gate each had a Trianon Ballroom. However, although they shared a common name, there is no indication that they shared common ownership or management.

The location in Chicago at 6201 Cottage Grove Avenue was the origination point for many live broadcasts on Chicago radio station WGN. From 1925 - 1928, it had its own radio station with the call letters WMBB for "World's Most Beautiful Ballroom." It was demolished in 1967.

On November 23, 1925, the location in Chicago was the site for a Rosary College Thanksgiving ball organized by Catholic club women of Chicago to raise funds for the Rosary College building fund.

The South Gate Trianon was owned by band leader Horace Heidt, a contemporary of Lawrence Welk, and was used for national radio broadcasts on the old Mutual Broadcasting system during World War II.

Of the Toledo Trianon, built in 1925 on Madison Avenue and torn down in 1954, it has been written:

Then there was the Trianon Ballroom. Talk about finding romance and falling in love! A night of dancing on the 60 by 180-foot dance floor cost 25 cents. Patrons could find romance and fall in love to the sounds of the best bands in the land. Giant mirror balls cast a romantic shower of diamonds over everyone. Great entertainment came from the Dorsey Brothers, Benny Goodman, Glenn Miller, and Toledo's own Helen O'Connell. So-called "low" beer, or 3.2 beer, nickel Cokes, and all this wonderful music made it so easy to fall in love at the Trianon. And if nothing else, more marriages were created at the Trianon than anything else. Good behavior was demanded and enforced. Acting up could result in being banned from the Trianon, sometimes for life! To many, this was the ultimate penalty.

The Seattle Trianon today has been converted an office building, (see: Victor Aloysius Meyers).
