= Loving You Has Made Me Bananas =

1968 novelty song by Guy Marks

"Loving You Has Made Me Bananas" is a 1968 hit novelty song composed and performed by Guy Marks. It parodies broadcasts of the big band era with absurdist and nonsensical lyrics.

It was first released in 1968 on ABC Records as a single with "Forgive Me My Love" on the B-side, some two years after "Winchester Cathedral" had triggered a revival of this musical form that had fallen out of fashion in the 1950s. It was also released in a stereo LP in 1968 (ABC Records ABCS-648) with additional legitimate 1930s and 1940s hits sung in the same style ("Object of My Affection", "Painted Tainted Rose", "Ti-Pi-Tin", "This Is Forever", "Amapola", "Postage Machine", "Careless", "Little Shoemaker", "Forgive Me My Love" and "Little Sir Echo"). It reached #53 in Canada.

The single was re-released in 1978, reaching No. 25 in the UK Singles Chart. The UK chart showing led to an appearance by Marks on Top of the Pops in May 1978. Two out of the three backing singers accidentally sang "Your father had the shopfitter blues", while the other one correctly sang "Your father had the shipfitter blues."
