= Joe Sanders =

American jazz musician (1896–1965)

Joseph L. Sanders (October 26, 1896, Thayer, Kansas – May 14, 1965, Kansas City, Missouri) was an American jazz pianist, singer, composer, and bandleader associated with Kansas City jazz for most of his career.

Sanders was best known for co-leading the Coon-Sanders' Nighthawks along with Carleton Coon (1894–1932). The pair formed the group in 1920 in Kansas City under the name Coon-Sanders Novelty Orchestra, broadcast for the first time on radio the following year, and became known as the Nighthawks because of their frequent appearances on late night radio. They recorded in Chicago in 1924 and held a residency at the Blackhawk club in that city from 1926. The ensemble toured as a Midwestern territory band, and after Coon's death Sanders continued to lead the band under his own name.

Sanders worked mostly in Hollywood studios in the 1940s, and occasionally led performances at the Blackhawk once again. He was a vocalist for the Kansas City Opera in the 1950s.

Sanders' brother, Roy Sanders (National League pitcher), was a professional baseball player.
