= Esther Allan =

American composer and pianist

- Born: Esther Boyarsky; April 28, 1914; Suwałki, Poland
- Died: July 21, 1985 (aged 71); Detroit, Michigan
- Occupations: composer, pianist and organist

Esther Allan (née Boyarsky; April 28, 1914 – July 21, 1985) was an American composer, pianist and organist.

== Early years ==
Esther Allan was born Esther Boyarsky in Suwałki, Poland. Her father was a cantor. She began playing the piano when she was only five, and took her first piano lessons with her mother. Her family moved to England when she was very young, and then to America.

== Career ==
She began working in New York City, both as a "classical" pianist (for example she performed Brahms's Piano Concerto No. 2 and Gershwin's Concerto in F during a recital at Carnegie Hall) and as a "jazz" pianist, in the vein of the "classical jazz" initiated by George Gershwin and Dana Suesse.

On June 16, 1935, she married in Detroit American jeweler and department store owner Norman Allan (1912–1999), to whom she later dedicated her Norman Concerto, a 6-minute piece for piano and orchestra in the vein of the Warsaw Concerto, which gained some success at the time and launched her as a composer. Once married, she used only her "American" name Allan, abandoning her maiden name.

She worked for a period of time as the pianist in Phil Spitalny's all-girl Hour of Charm Orchestra, as well as an affiliate pianist of Aileen Shirley's all-girl orchestra, "The Minoco Maids Of Melody".

As a composer, aside from "the Norman Concerto", she wrote other short pieces for piano and orchestra: Ocean Rhapsody, Romantic Concerto... described as being "an exact synthesis between Rachmaninov, Gershwin and the Warsaw Concerto", and Meditation for Piano, Harp and Strings, all homages to her native Poland. These works, as well as "the Norman Concerto", were regularly performed by Allan, accompanied by the Detroit Sinfonietta, conducted by Felix Resnick. A vinyl album of their performances was published in the 1960s.

She arranged for piano and orchestra several works, including classical hits as Chopin's Nocturne in C minor, Op. 48, No. 1 and Beethoven's piano sonata No. 17, "The Tempest", and variety songs as "Bethie's Theme", "Enchantment", and "Freddie's Running".

She composed numerous short works for piano solo for her own recitals, around thirty songs, some chamber musics (including "Autumn Nocturne" for piano and harp) as well as some larger-scaled orchestral concert works.

== Family ==
She lived in Detroit, Michigan, with her husband and four children. Her oldest child, Sally Allan Alexander, became a piano teacher. Allan performed with several local musical ensembles and hosted many classical piano performances.

== Death ==
She died on July 21, 1985, in Detroit, aged 71, from heart failure.
