= The Hour of Charm =

American old-time radio music program

- Genre: Music
- Country of origin: United States
- Language: English
- Syndicates: CBS; NBC
- Hosted by: Rosalind Green; Arlene Francis
- Starring: Phil Spitalny; Evelyn Kaye
- Announcer: Ken Roberts; Ron Rawson; Richard Stark
- Directed by: Joseph Ripley
- Original release: May 18, 1934 – May 2, 1948
- Opening theme: The American Hymn of Liberty
- Ending theme: We Must Be Vigilant
- Sponsored by: Cheramy (Summer 1934); Linit Bath Oil; Zotos Machineless Permanent Wave; General Electric; Combined electric cooperatives

The Hour of Charm is an American old-time radio music program. It debuted on CBS on May 18, 1934, and had its final broadcast on CBS on May 2, 1948. The program also was broadcast on Armed Forces Radio, and after its network broadcasts ended, a new version was syndicated via transcriptions.

== Schedules ==
The table below shows the program's varied schedules and sponsors during its time on network radio.

Beginning Date	Ending Date	Network	Day	Time (Eastern)	Sponsor
May 18, 1934	June 1, 1934	CBS	Friday	10:30-10:45	Cheramy
June 6, 1934	September 26, 1934	CBS	Wednesday	8 - 8:15	Cheramy
January 3, 1935	June 25, 1935	CBS	Thursday	8 - 8:30 (later 9:30-10)	Linit Bath Oil
February 23, 1936	June 21, 1936	CBS	Sunday	6:30 - 7	Zotos Machineless Permanent Wave
November 2, 1936	September 1, 1946	NBC	various	various	General Electric
September 29, 1946	May 2, 1948	CBS	Sunday	afternoon	Combined electric cooperatives

Source: On the Air: The Encyclopedia of Old-Time Radio

== Personnel ==
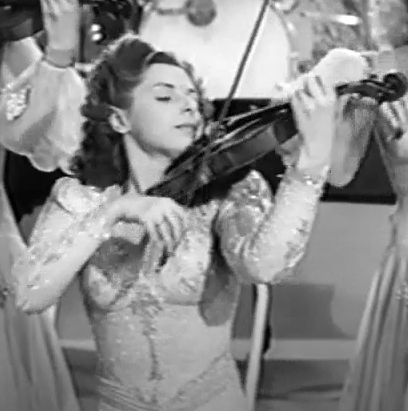
Evelyn Kaye plays with the Hour of Charm Orchestra in this screen capture from Army-Navy Screen Magazine Number 22.

The musical group featured in the program was originally called Phil Spitalny's All-Girl Orchestra. Spitalny directed the group that, as the name implies, was composed only of females. In time, however, the group became so associated with the program that it became known as the Hour of Charm Orchestra.

Violinist Evelyn Kaye was the concertmistress and featured player. On the air, she was identified only by her first name —as was Spitalny's policy with all of his musicians — billed as "Evelyn and Her Magic Violin". She was with the group from its inception until its disbanding, and she married Spitalny in 1946.

Acclaimed drummer Viola Smith joined as the group's drummer in 1942, replacing Mary McClanahan. Rosalind Green was the initial on-air hostess, a role that Arlene Francis filled later. Announcers were Ken Roberts, Ron Rawson, and Richard Stark. The director was Joseph Ripley.

== Critical reception ==
The trade publication Billboard published two reviews of The Hour of Charm. The March 7, 1936, review called the program "a tuneful affair, revealing several excellent arrangements, the better ones being of the South American tang ..."

A brief review in the December 31, 1938, issue pointed out several shortcomings of a remote broadcast from the Hotel Biltmore in New York. Daniel Richman described the broadcast as "so laden with arrangements, production trappings, descriptions of the girls' clothes and talents, and so much general excess baggage that it sounded more like the Ford Sunday Evening Symphony than a dance remote."

The August 1, 1942, issue of Billboard reported that Arturo Toscanini considered The Hour of Charm to be his favorite radio program.

== Transcribed broadcasts ==
In 1951, the RCA Thesaurus electrical transcription service launched a new Hour of Charm radio series. Stations that broadcast the program included WFLA AM and FM in Tampa, Florida.
