= The Four Step Brothers =

American dance group

- The group in the 1942 film When Johnny Comes Marching Home

Background information
- Also known as: Step Brothers; The Three Step Brothers; "The Eight Feet of Rhythm"
- Genres: Tap dance, flash dance
- Works: see Filmography
- Years active: c. 1925–1970
- Spinoffs: Four Steps and a Miss, aka Third Generation Steps
- Awards: see Awards
- Past members: Maceo Anderson; Al Williams; Red Walker; Sherman Robinson; Sylvester "Happy" Johnson; Prince Spencer; Freddie James; Rufus "Flash" McDonald; Sunshine Sammy Morrison; Norman Rowe; Edward Bozeman; Terry Criner

The Four Step Brothers were an African-American dance group, known for their tap dancing and acrobatic flash dancing. The quartet was the first black act to perform at Radio City Music Hall, the first to appear at the Chez Paree nightclub in Chicago, and the first to break television's color bar. Formed in the mid-1920s, the group was active, with various members, as late as 1970.

== Style and moves ==
The group became known for their complex dance routines. The "Brothers" incorporated snake hips, five-tap wings, slides, rhythm (jazz) tap, the camel walk, the strut, straight acrobatics, etc. They tried not to change their dance steps except to make them better or when incorporating new dancers. They were known for their "challenge dances" in which they tried to outdo one another in routines that used no music. Each dancer would solo while the other dancers stood back, clapping hands and stomping feet.

== Career ==
The group started out as a trio in 1925, with the original members, Maceo Anderson, Al Williams and Red Walker. Although their original name was the Step Brothers, because that was also the name of another famous young tap dancing quartet, they subsequently changed their name to The Three Step Brothers. In 1927, after accepting a new member, Sherman Robinson, they became The Four Step Brothers. Dubbed "The Eight Feet of Rhythm," the group soon traveled with Duke Ellington. While starring with the group, Anderson also appeared at the Hoofers Club and worked part-time as a newsboy.

The Four Step Brothers played the Cotton Club for four years, traveled the Keith-Orpheum circuit and the "Chitlin' Circuit," danced annually (for a decade) at Radio City Music Hall, and went around the world four times. They toured 12 European countries, receiving standing ovations from royalty. In the U.S., they danced for presidents Truman and Eisenhower.

In 1950, The Four Step Brothers appeared on Milton Berle's Texaco Star Theater, over the objections of the show's sponsor. Berle wrote in his autobiography:

I remember clashing with the advertising agency and the sponsor over my signing the Four Step Brothers for an appearance on the show. The only thing I could figure out was that there was an objection to black performers on the show, but I couldn't even find out who was objecting. "We just don't like them," I was told, but who the hell was "we"? Because I was riding high in 1950, I sent out the word: "If they don't go on, I don't go on." At ten minutes of eight—ten minutes before showtime—I got permission for the Step Brothers to appear. If I broke the color-line policy or not, I don't know, but later on I had no trouble booking Bill Robinson or Lena Horne.

During the 1950s and 1960s, The Four Step Brothers appeared on The Ed Sullivan Show, the ABC variety program The Guy Mitchell Show, on Bob Hope specials, and in telecasts featuring Dean Martin and Jerry Lewis, Perry Como and Steve Allen.

The Four Step Brothers became one of the longest-lasting dance groups, surviving for more than four decades into the 1960s. They were active as late as 1970, then performing in Reno, Nevada.

=== Filmography ===
The Four Step Brothers appeared in numerous films including Check and Double Check (1930), the Vitaphone short Barbershop Blues (1933), When Johnny Comes Marching Home (1942), It Ain't Hay (1943), Rhythm of the Islands (1943), Carolina Blues (1944), Greenwich Village (1944), That's My Gal (1947), Here Come the Girls (1953), and The Patsy (1964).

=== Awards ===
The Dance Masters of America awarded the group a lifetime achievement award in 1960, and again in 1985 for helping to break the color barrier. In 1988, they received their own star on the Hollywood Walk of Fame.

== Members ==
Other members of the group during its long tenure included Sylvester "Happy" Johnson; Prince Spencer, who joined the group in 1941 replacing Johnson; Freddie James, who performed with the group from 1939 to 1943; Rufus "Flash" McDonald, who joined the act in 1943 when James left; Ernie "Sunshine Sammy" Morrison; and Norman Rowe.

When Prince Spencer left the group to go into the Chicago grocery business, he was replaced by Edward Bozeman. Before his Step Brother days, Bozeman also danced professionally under the name of “Prince.” The name was not the only coincidence. Like Spencer, Bozeman did the acrobatics and flips part of the routine and always danced last, in the same spot that Spencer had held. Step Brother Flash McDonald said at the time, “Let him be himself, instead of doing Prince’s (Spencer’s) routines.” They all agreed. “They thought I was a kid, but I was 35,” Bozeman recalled. Although there is very rare footage of Bozeman performing with the Four Step Brothers, he was a member of the group for 10 years.

Subsequent to the addition of Bozeman, there was one other dancer who, essentially, may be considered the "final" addition to the famous dance quartet's immediate family. In 1968, a ten year-old, acrobatic ball of energy, named Terry Criner was brought on at the end of the quartet's already superior performance. The four simultaneously pointed towards stage right and Little Terry dashed onto the stage – with a series of acrobatic moves. His routine was very similar to Bozeman's, however; the kid added head spins, somersaults, no-hand head flip – all done with lightning speed. Several newspapers described him as a blur. Criner, who courageously followed Bozeman, was up to the task and was acknowledged by the group's charter members as a "great addition."

Terry Criner was a fourth-grade elementary student when he was picked to share the stage with some of the greatest dancers in tap history. Although a novice in the art of tap dancing, his acrobatic-dance skills combined landed him into a unique place in history. Criner was the protégé of Maceo E. Anderson, one of the original members. Criner simultaneously toured with the Step Brothers and opened as a solo act for Donald O'Connor for nearly three years.

Criner eventually agreed with Maceo Anderson's idea of starting a new group. Initially called Four Steps and a Miss, the troupe became the Third Generation Steps. The group went on to successes of its own. In 1979, after 11 years of a rather successful show business stint, the 21-year-old Criner shocked Maceo Anderson and group members Cindy Notz and Ivery Wheeler by announcing his retirement at the peak of the group's success.
