= Viola Smith =

American musician (1912–2020)

Background information
- Born: Viola Schmitz; November 29, 1912; Mount Calvary, Wisconsin, US
- Died: October 21, 2020 (aged 107) Costa Mesa, California, US
- Occupation: Musician
- Instrument: Drums

Viola Clara Smith (née Schmitz; November 29, 1912 – October 21, 2020) was an American drummer best known for her work in orchestras, swing bands, and popular music from the 1920s until 1975. She was one of the first professional female drummers, and was the world's longest-lived female drummer, dying in October 2020 at the age of 107. She played five times on The Ed Sullivan Show, as well as in two films and the Broadway musical Cabaret.

== Early life ==
Schmitz was born in Mount Calvary, Wisconsin, on November 29, 1912. She grew up there with seven sisters and two brothers. All learned piano first, but only the girls were to be in an "all-girl" orchestra conceived by their father. She chose to drum because the other instruments she liked were already played by her older siblings (she was the sixth child). Her parents operated a concert hall and tavern in neighboring Fond du Lac.

== Career ==
In the 1920s and 1930s, Smith played in the Schmitz Sisters Family Orchestra — later, Smith Sisters Orchestra — that her father founded in Wisconsin. Irene (Schmitz) Abler played trombone, Erma Schmitz on vibraphone, Edwina Schmitz on trumpet, Viola Schmitz on drums, Lila Schmitz on saxophone, Mildred (Schmitz) Bartash on bass violin, Loretta (Schmitz) Loehr on piano, and Sally (Schmitz) Ellenback on bass saxophone. They toured the Radio-Keith-Orpheum (RKO) circuit of vaudeville and movie theaters on weekends and summer vacation while some of the sisters were still in school. According to her nephew, Dennis Bartash, playing with her sisters on the Major Bowes Amateur Hour radio show in the 1930s was her big break. In 1938, Viola and Mildred started the Coquettes, an all-female orchestra, which existed until 1942. Mildred Bartash played the clarinet and the saxophone.

Smith penned an article in 1942 for Down Beat magazine titled "Give Girl Musicians a Break!" in which she argued that woman musicians could play just as well as men. She argued, "In these times of national emergency, many of the star instrumentalists of the big name bands are being drafted. Instead of replacing them with what may be mediocre talent, why not let some of the great girl musicians of the country take their place?''

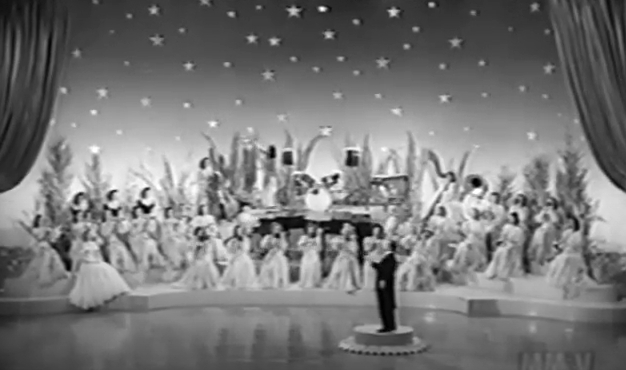
The Hour of Charm Orchestra. Smith's distinctive drum kit can be seen at the back.

In 1942, after Mildred got married, Smith moved to New York, was given handmade snare drums from one of her teachers, Billy Gladstone, received a summer scholarship to Juilliard, and joined Phil Spitalny's Hour of Charm Orchestra, a commercially-successful all-girl orchestra. Later, she would play with the NBC Symphony Orchestra. Her signature style of 13 drums, particularly, two 16 inch tom-toms at shoulder height, was never copied; however, Smith noted Louis Bellson using 2 bass drums after meeting and observing Smith with the tom-toms. During this time, Smith recorded music for the films When Johnny Comes Marching Home and Here Come the Co-Eds as a member of the National Symphony Orchestra, and even performed with Ella Fitzgerald and Chick Webb. She gained notoriety as the "fastest girl drummer," and she started saying "Gene Krupa is the male Viola Smith." Smith performed at president Harry Truman's inauguration in 1949. She remained with the Hour of Charm orchestra until 1954.

After Hour of Charm disbanded, Smith led her own band, Viola and her Seventeen Drums. From 1966 to 1970, she played with the Kit Kat Band, which was part of the original 1960s Broadway production of Cabaret. Allegro Magazine Volume 113 Number 10, from November 10, 2013, featured Smith in the article "A Century of Swing 'Never lose your groove!'"

== Personal life ==
Smith never married. She had been engaged to be married, but the man was drafted into World War II, and the engagement was cancelled. At the time of Smith's 107th birthday in November 2019, it was reported that she occasionally still drummed with bands in Costa Mesa, California, as one of the oldest living mainstream musicians.

Smith died on October 21, 2020, at her home in Costa Mesa, California, at the age of 107. She had been suffering from Alzheimer's disease in the time leading up to her death.

== Film appearances ==
- When Johnny Comes Marching Home (1942)
- Here Come the Co-Eds (1945)

== Television appearances ==
- I've Got a Secret (CBS)
- The Ed Sullivan Show (CBS) – five occasions

== Broadway musicals ==
- Cabaret
