= Cowboy Canteen =

1944 film by Lew Landers

- Directed by: Lew Landers
- Written by: Felix Adler (additional dialogue)
- Screenplay by: Paul Gangelin
- Produced by: Jack Fier
- Starring: Charles Starrett
- Cinematography: George Meehan
- Edited by: Aaron Stell
- Production company: Columbia Pictures
- Distributed by: Columbia Pictures
- Release date: February 8, 1944
- Running time: 72 minutes
- Country: United States
- Language: English

Cowboy Canteen is a 1944 American musical Western film directed by Lew Landers and starring Charles Starrett.

== Plot ==
Entertainers perform on a dude ranch for soldiers.

== Cast ==
- Charles Starrett as Steve Bradley
- Jane Frazee as Connie Gray
- Barbara Jo Allen as Vera Vague (as Vera Vague)
- Tex Ritter as Tex Coulter
- Guinn 'Big Boy' Williams as Spud Harrigan (as Guinn [Big Boy] Williams)
- The Mills Brothers as The Mills Brothers
- Roy Acuff and His Smoky Mountain Boys and Girls as Singing Group
- Jimmy Wakely and His Saddle Pals as Singing Group
- Max Terhune as Professor Merlin
- Dub Taylor as Cannonball
- Tailor Maids as Singers (as The Tailor Maids)
- Bill Hughes as Bill Hughes
- Buck Chickie and Buck as Whip Act

== See also ==
- List of American films of 1944
