= Flashdance (disambiguation) =

Flashdance is a 1983 American romantic drama dance film.

Flashdance may also refer to:

- Flashdance (soundtrack), soundtrack to the 1983 film
  - "Flashdance... What a Feeling", film's title song by Irene Cara
- Flashdance (musical), 2008 stage musical
- "Flashdance" (song), 2004 single by Deep Dish
- Flash dance, acrobatic form of jazz dance
- Flash Dance, NATO codename for the Soviet/Russian radar N007 Zaslon
