= A Guy Could Change =

1946 film by William K. Howard

- Theatrical release poster
- Directed by: William K. Howard
- Written by: F. Hugh Herbert (story); Al Martin
- Produced by: William K. Howard; William J. O'Sullivan
- Starring: Allan Lane; Jane Frazee; Robert Blake; Wallace Ford; Adele Mara; Gerald Mohr
- Production company: Republic Pictures
- Distributed by: Republic Pictures
- Release date: January 27, 1946
- Running time: 65 minutes
- Country: United States
- Language: English

A Guy Could Change is a 1946 American drama film starring Allan Lane and Jane Frazee. The supporting cast features 13-year-old Robert Blake (billed as "Bobby Blake"), Wallace Ford, Adele Mara and Gerald Mohr. A Guy Could Change was the final film of director William K. Howard.

== Plot ==
Newspaperman Michael Hogan finds himself alone with a newborn daughter to take care of, after his wife has died in child labor. Mike is devastated and has no idea how to raise little Nancy, but his sister Grace and her husband Bill agrees to relief him of his duties as a father, letting the girl live with them.

Nancy stays with Grace and Bill for eight years, while Mike lives the life of a bachelor, only contributing to his daughter's upbringing by paying an allowance. Feeling ashamed of her father's absence, Nancy concocts stories about him to share with her friends. At the same time, Mike is out with his friend George Cummings at a drive-in, trying to pick up a waitress named Barbara Adams, without success.

Grace tries to protect Nancy by telling her that her father is very busy at work and doesn't have the time to come see her. This makes Nancy act on her father's behalf, paying a visit to Mike's boss, McCarthy, demanding that her father get more time to spend with his daughter.

Mike doesn't give up on dating Barbara, returning to the drive-in, pretending to write an article about her workplace. He convinces her boss that she get the day off for an interview, and she reluctantly agrees to spend the day with him.

In spite of this, they get along fine, but when Mike eventually kisses Barbara, his boss turns up and scolds him for not spending time with his neglected daughter. Barbara changes her mind about Mike and decides to not see him again. Mike decides to try and spend some time with his daughter and takes her to the drive-in, where she meets Barbara.

Barbara quickly takes to Nancy and the three of them go bowling together. Mike and Barbara become a couple and all seems fine, until a bank robber Barbara helped get convicted through a testimony in court breaks out from prison. His name is Eddy, and he comes to town to get his revenge on Barbara. He finds out where she lives and arrives to her home with a gun.

Eddy shoots Barbara and gets into a fist fight with Mike. The police arrive and Eddy is killed by a bullet. Barbara is transported to the hospital. Soon Mike is informed that she will recover in full. Mike decides to marry her and starts planning for the wedding and his new life as a family father.

== Cast ==
- Allan Lane as Michael 'Mike' Hogan
- Jane Frazee as Barbara Adams
- Twinkle Watts as Nancy Hogan
- Robert Blake as Alan Schroeder (billed as "Bobby Blake")
- Wallace Ford as Bill Conley
- Adele Mara as Bernice
- Gerald Mohr as Eddy Raymond
