= Lee Gordon (musician) =

- Birth name: Lavern Elton Gordon
- Also known as: Stubby Gordon
- Born: May 12, 1902 Warren, Pennsylvania, U.S.
- Died: October 3, 1946 (aged 44) Cleveland, Ohio, U.S.
- Genres: Jazz

Lee "Stubby" Gordon (born Lavern Elton Gordon; May 12, 1902 – October 3, 1946) was an American musician and bandleader who conducted the Rhythm Masters orchestra and wrote the music for songs such as "Tell Me Dreamy Eyes", "Worryin' Blues", and "Rippin' It Off."

== Career ==
One of the most renowned saxophonists, he joined Phil Spitalny's orchestra and was soon promoted to director. He later became music director of WTAM and conductor of the NBC Orchestra. Gordon was the first to broadcast Franklin D. Roosevelt Jr.'s song, "The Rest of My Life With You".

== Personal life ==
Lavern Elton Gordon was born in Warren, Pennsylvania, on May 12, 1902, and died in Cleveland, Ohio, on October 3, 1946, aged 44. He was interred in the family plot in Oakland Cemetery, Warren.
