= Under California Stars =

1948 film by William Witney

- Directed by: William Witney
- Screenplay by: Paul Gangelin; Sloan Nibley
- Story by: Paul Gangelin
- Produced by: Edward J. White
- Starring: Roy Rogers; Trigger; Jane Frazee; Andy Devine
- Cinematography: Jack A. Marta
- Edited by: Tony Martinelli
- Music by: R. Dale Butts; Mort Glickman; Ernest Gold; Nathan Scott
- Production company: Republic Pictures
- Distributed by: Republic Pictures
- Release date: April 30, 1948 (United States)
- Running time: 70 minutes; 54 minutes
- Country: United States
- Language: English
- Budget: $261,432

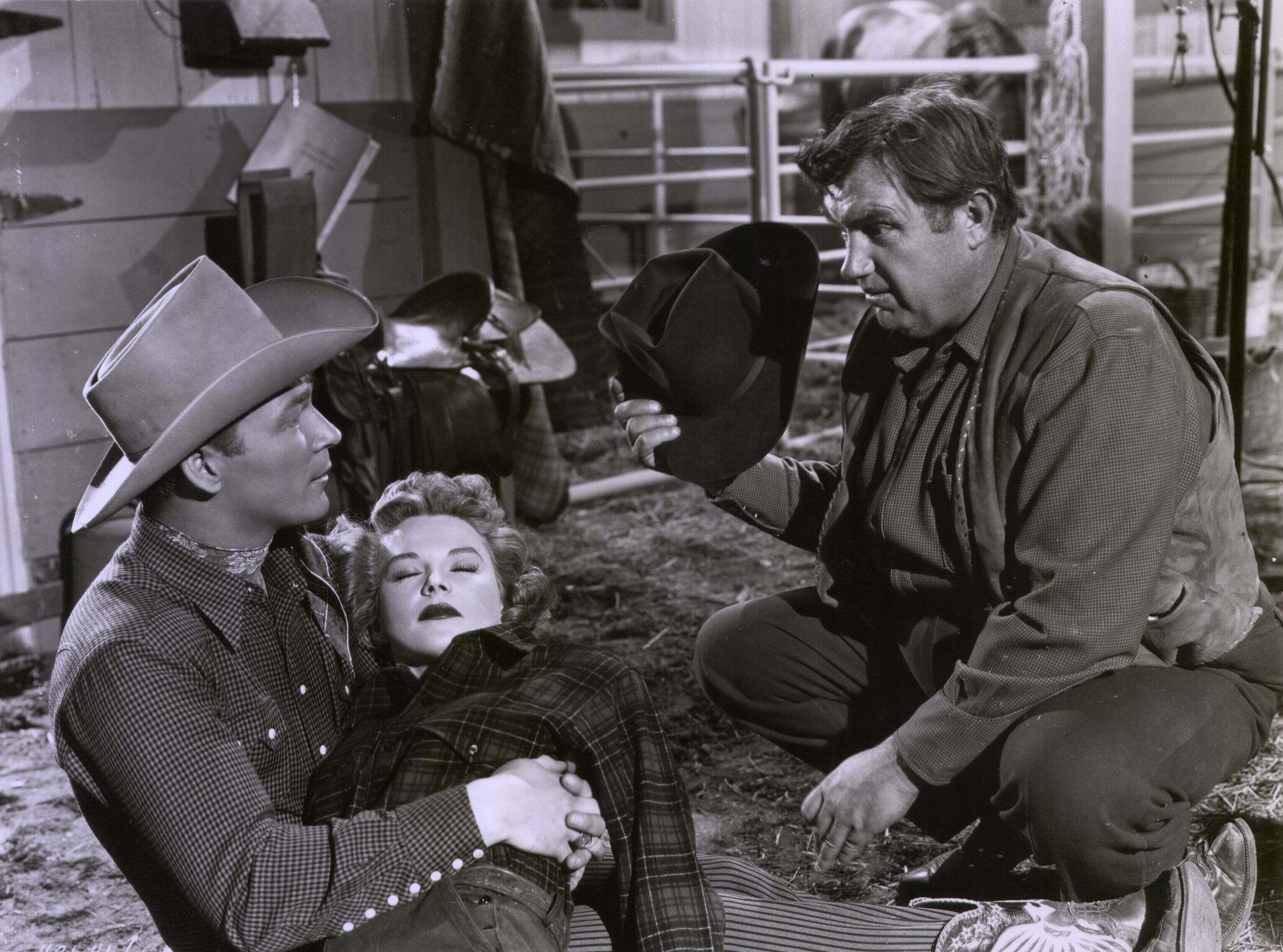
Roy Rogers, Jane Frazee, and Andy Devine

Under California Stars is a 1948 American Trucolor Western film directed by William Witney and starring Roy Rogers, Jane Frazee and Andy Devine. The film was shot in Trucolor. After returning from Hollywood after his tenth anniversary in films to his ranch, Rogers tackles a gang who kidnap his horse Trigger and hold it to ransom.

This film is now in the public domain.

== Plot ==
Roy has just finished his latest film and leaves for his ranch where be will be broadcasting a show celebrating his tenth year in movies. When Roy and Trigger arrive at his ranch he finds Cookie has hired his relatives. Caroline, the only relative that doesn't have a strong resemblance to Cookie, is the horse trainer.

Bob tells Roy a gang of men are hunting range horses. Roy puts a stop to hunting on his land. Pop decides there's money in kidnapping Trigger and demands a $100,000 ransom. McFarland's stepson, Ted, and his dog Tramp, run away and is found hiding in Roy's barn. A trap is set to catch the kidnappers ranch.

== Cast ==
- Roy Rogers as Roy Rogers
- Trigger as Trigger, Roy's Horse
- Jane Frazee as Caroline Bullfincher
- Andy Devine as Cookie Bullfincher / Alf Bullfincher
- George Lloyd as Pop Jordan
- Wade Crosby as Lige McFarland
- Michael Chapin as Ted Carver
- House Peters Jr. as Henchman Ed
- Steve Clark as Sheriff
- Joseph A. Garro as John the Banker
- Paul Power as Movie Director Paul
- John Wald as WYX Radio Announcer
- Bob Nolan as Bob
- Sons of the Pioneers as musicians, ranch hands

== Soundtrack ==
- Roy Rogers, Jane Frazee and the Sons of the Pioneers - "Under California Stars" (Written by Jack Elliott)
- Andy Devine and the Sons of the Pioneers - "Rogers, King of the Cowboys" (Written by Jack Elliott)
- Roy Rogers and the Sons of the Pioneers - "Dust" (Written by Johnny Marvin)
- Sons of the Pioneers - "Serenade to a Coyote" (Written by Andy Parker)
- Roy Rogers and the Sons of the Pioneers - "Little Saddle Pal" (Written by Jack Elliott)
