= Maceo Anderson =

American dancer

- Born: September 3, 1910 (Note: Date of birth is per his World War II draft registration card; some sources list his year of birth as 1909.); Lakeland, Florida, U.S. (Note: Place of birth is per his World War II draft registration card; some sources list his place of birth as South Carolina.)
- Died: July 4, 2001 (aged 90); Los Angeles, California, U.S.
- Occupation(s): Dancer, dance teacher
- Years active: c. 1925–1999
- Spouse: Mary Anderson
- Career
- Former groups: The Four Step Brothers
- Dances: Tap dance, flash dance

Maceo Edward Anderson (September 3, 1910 – July 4, 2001) was an American dancer and a founding member of the dance group The Four Step Brothers.

== Biography ==
Anderson was born in 1910 in Lakeland, Florida. He expressed an interest in dancing at the age of three, when his family was living in Charleston, South Carolina. Three years later, the family moved to Harlem, where Anderson would sneak into the Lafayette Theatre to watch performances. In his teen years, he founded a trio of dancers who performed at the Cotton Club in Harlem. They went on to perform with Duke Ellington and his orchestra; Ellington wrote "The Mystery Song" for the group.

Anderson was the founder of the tap dancing group known as The Four Step Brothers. The group performed successfully from the mid-1920s into the 1960s. They were credited as being the first black act to perform at Radio City Music Hall. The Four Step Brothers also made television and motion picture appearances. Their dance routines were a unique blend of soft shoe, tap, acrobatic tricks (known as flash dancing), and complicated footwork. Anderson performed with the group throughout their existence.

During World War II, The Four Step Brothers performed in several Hollywood films, such as When Johnny Comes Marching Home (1942). Anderson joined the United States Army in February 1943. In 1946, The Four Step Brothers performed with Frank Sinatra and then embarked on a six-month performance at the Parisian Le Lido followed by tours to Italy and Spain. In 1953, they performed with Bob Hope in Here Come the Girls.

After retiring from dance, Anderson became a church minister and actively worked to help the homeless in the Los Angeles area. The Four Step Brothers were honored in 1988 with a star on the Hollywood Walk of Fame.

Anderson died in Los Angeles on July 4, 2001.
