= Jane Frazee =

American actress (1915–1985)

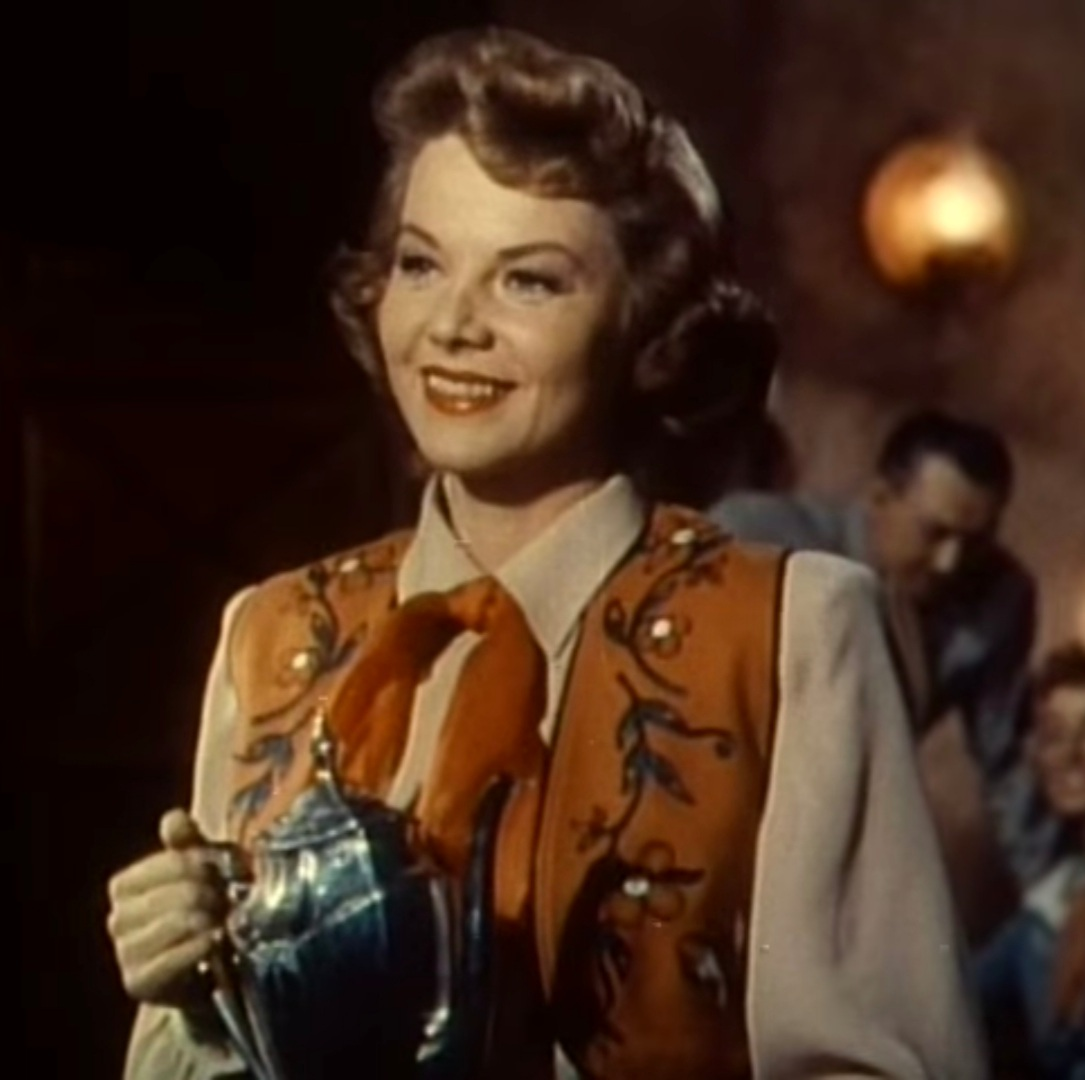
- Frazee in Under California Stars (1948)
- Born: Mary Jane Frehse; July 18, 1915; Saint Paul, Minnesota, U.S.
- Died: September 6, 1985 (aged 70); Newport Beach, California, U.S.
- Occupations: Actress; singer; dancer
- Years active: 1921–1956
- Spouses: Glenn Tryon (m. 1942; div. 1947): Whitey Christensen (m. 1948; div. 19??); David Hugh Leatherman (m. 1957; div. 19??)
- Children: 1

Mary Jane Frehse (July 18, 1915 – September 6, 1985), was an American actress, singer, and dancer.

== Professional life ==
Jane, age six, and her 12-year-old sister Ruth formed a singing vaudeville act known as The Frazee Sisters. The act broke up in 1940, when Jane landed a leading role in the B film Melody and Moonlight (1940) for Republic Pictures. Shortly after the film's release she was signed by Universal Pictures and was featured in Buck Privates, the high-grossing 1941 comedy/World War II film starring Bud Abbott and Lou Costello. The strong impression she made in that film elevated her to leading-lady roles in Universal's popular "B" musicals, usually appearing opposite Robert Paige. She left Universal in late 1942, when she married actor-director Glenn Tryon, who was 16 years her senior. The actress was still very much in demand and returned to Republic for more musicals. She also appeared frequently in budget features for Columbia Pictures.

After World War II, most of the larger Hollywood studios curtailed their lower-budget productions and produced fewer features. This affected scores of actors, who sought refuge at the smaller studios that had been making low-budget features all along. Thus, Jane Frazee found steady if unprestigious work at Monogram Pictures and Lippert Pictures, in addition to her Republic duties. This led to the even lower-budgeted and faster-paced fields of westerns and television (including the early series Adventures of Superman, in a small but memorable part as the outspoken rural woman who picks up a dazed Clark Kent in her car in the popular episode, "Panic in the Sky" (1953)).

The actress ended her screen career co-starring in short subjects produced by Warner Brothers. These were the popular Joe McDoakes comedies starring George O'Hanlon. The 10-minute shorts were domestic sketches noted for their wild comic exaggeration, and Frazee (who appeared without billing) earned her laughs with excellent comedy timing. The series lapsed in 1956.

== Personal life and death ==
On May 28, 1942, Frazee married associate producer Glenn Tryon in Yuma, Arizona. They were divorced on April 16, 1947, in Las Vegas, Nevada, and had one son, Timothy. On April 24, 1948, Frazee married Whitey Christensen, a screen double for Roy Rogers, in Las Vegas, Nevada.

Frazee died of pneumonia at the Flagship Health Center in Newport Beach, California in 1985, aged 70.

== Filmography ==
=== Billed with sister Ruth as The Frazee Sisters ===
- Captain Blue Blood (1935)
- Study and Understudy (1936)
- Up in Lights (1938)
- Rollin' in Rhythm (1939)
- Pharmacy Frolics (1939)
- Arcade Varieties (1939)
- Swing Styles (1939)

=== Films ===
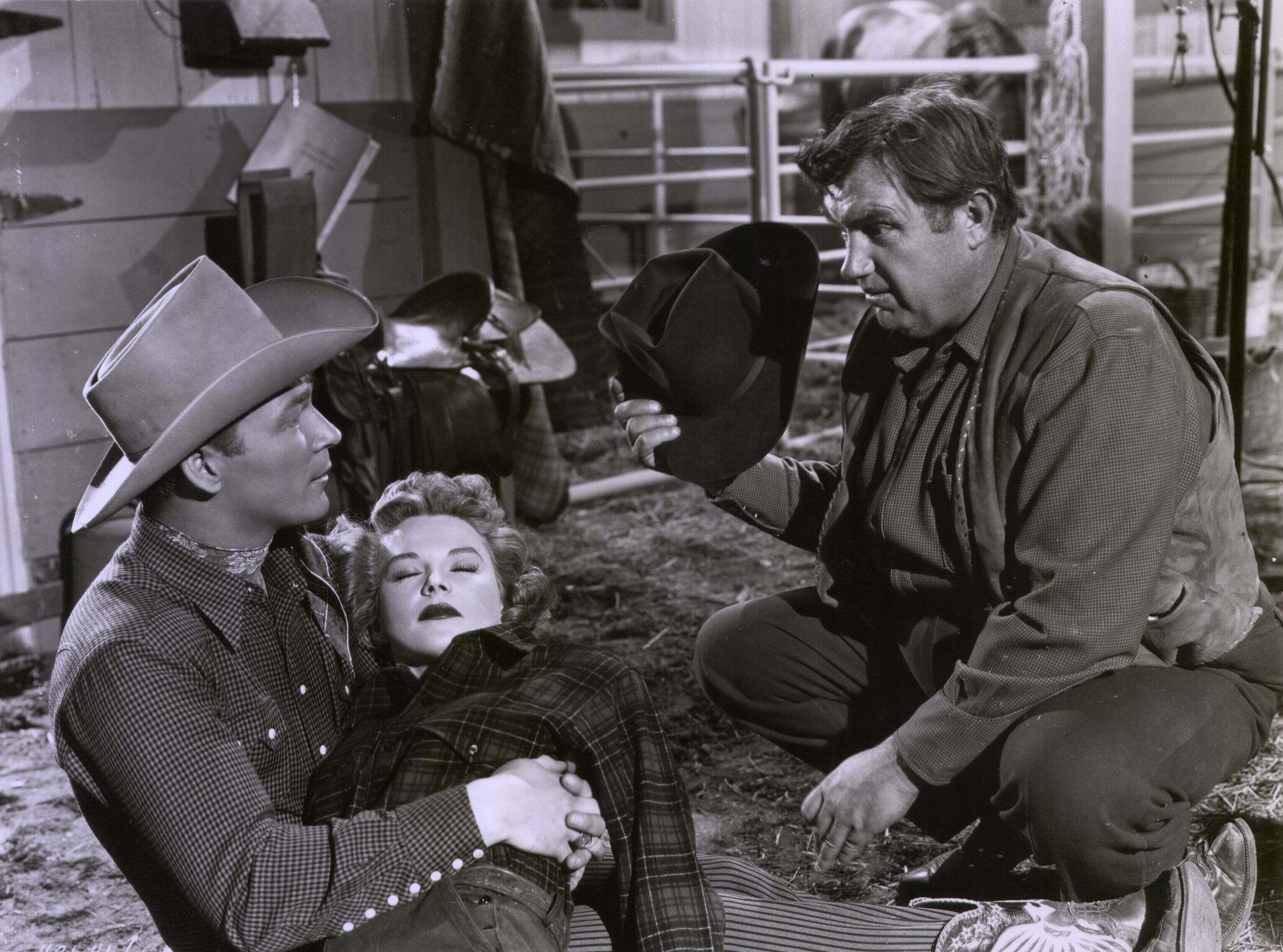
Frazee with Roy Rogers and Andy Devine in Under California Stars (1948)

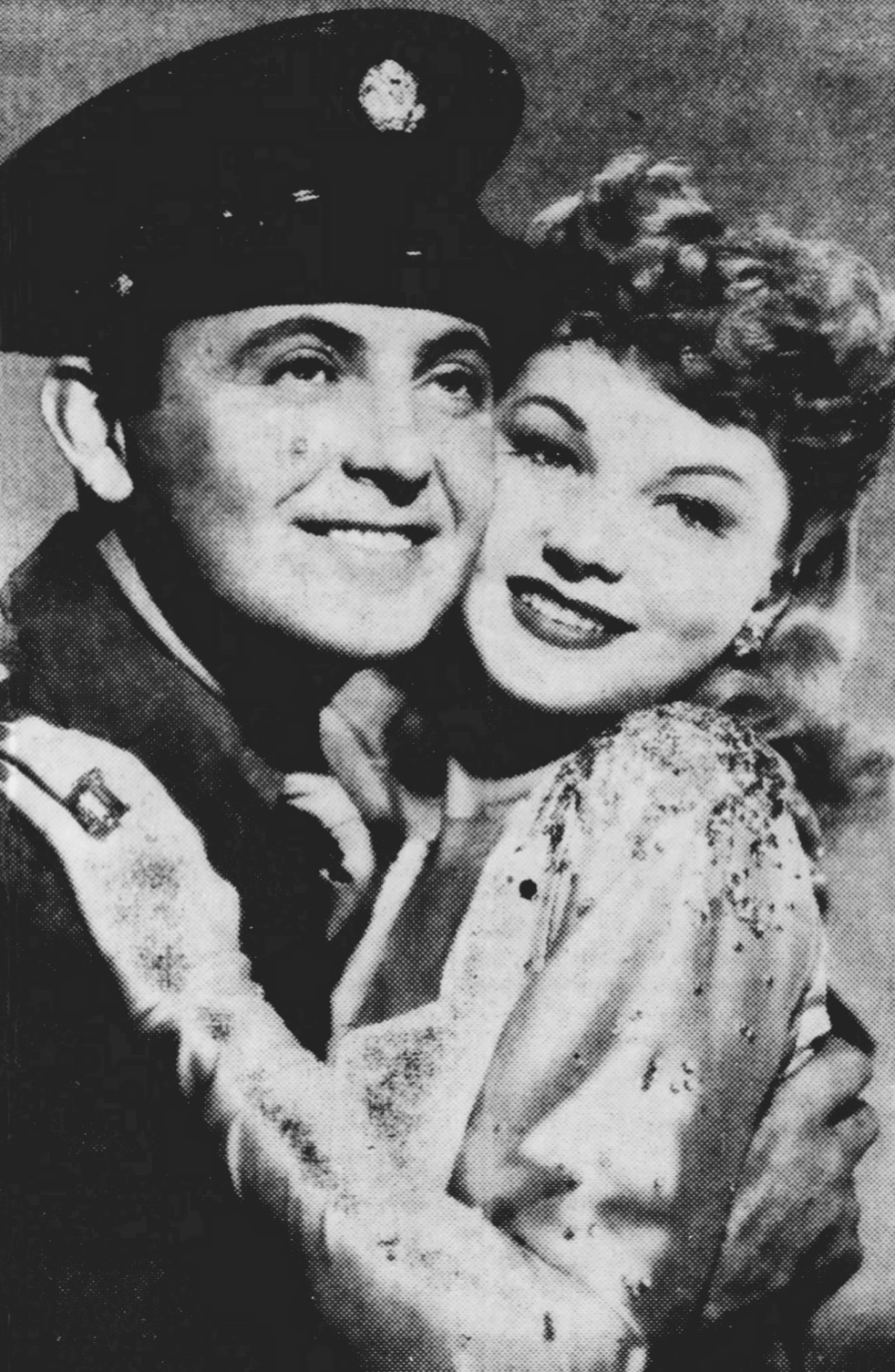
Allan Jones and Jane Frazee in When Johnny Comes Marching Home, 1943

- Melody and Moonlight (1940)
- Music in the Morgan Manner (1941) (as Herself)
- Buck Privates (1941)
- Angels with Broken Wings (1941)
- San Antonio Rose (1941)
- Sing Another Chorus (1941)
- Moonlight in Hawaii (1941)
- Hellzapoppin' (1941)
- Don't Get Personal (1942)
- What's Cookin'? (1942)
- Almost Married (1942)
- Moonlight Masquerade (1942)
- Get Hep to Love (1942)
- Moonlight in Havana (1942)
- When Johnny Comes Marching Home (1942)
- Hi'ya, Chum (1943)
- Keep 'Em Slugging (1943) (in footage from Hi'ya, Chum)
- Rhythm of the Islands (1943)
- Beautiful but Broke (1944)
- Cowboy Canteen (1944)
- Rosie the Riveter (1944)
- Swing in the Saddle (1944)
- Kansas City Kitty (1944)
- She's a Sweetheart (1944)
- Practically Yours (1944)
- The Big Bonanza (1944)
- Ten Cents a Dance (1945)
- Swingin' on a Rainbow (1945)
- George White's Scandals (1945)
- A Guy Could Change (1946)
- Calendar Girl (1947)
- Springtime in the Sierras (1947)
- On the Old Spanish Trail (1947)
- The Gay Ranchero (1948)
- Under California Stars (1948)
- Incident (1948)
- Grand Canyon Trail (1948)
- Last of the Wild Horses (1948)
- Rhythm Inn (1951)

=== Joe McDoakes short subjects ===
Jane Frazee co-starred as Joe's wife Alice, without screen credit:

- So You Want to Be Your Own Boss (1954)
- So You Want to Go to a Nightclub (1954)
- So You're Taking in a Roomer (1954)
- So You Want to Know Your Relatives (1954)
- So You Don't Trust Your Wife (1955)
- So You Want to Be a Gladiator (1955)
- So You Want a Model Railroad (1955)
- So You Think the Grass is Greener (1956)
