= Hoofers Club =

Former entertainment establishment

Coordinates: 40.813°N 73.943°W

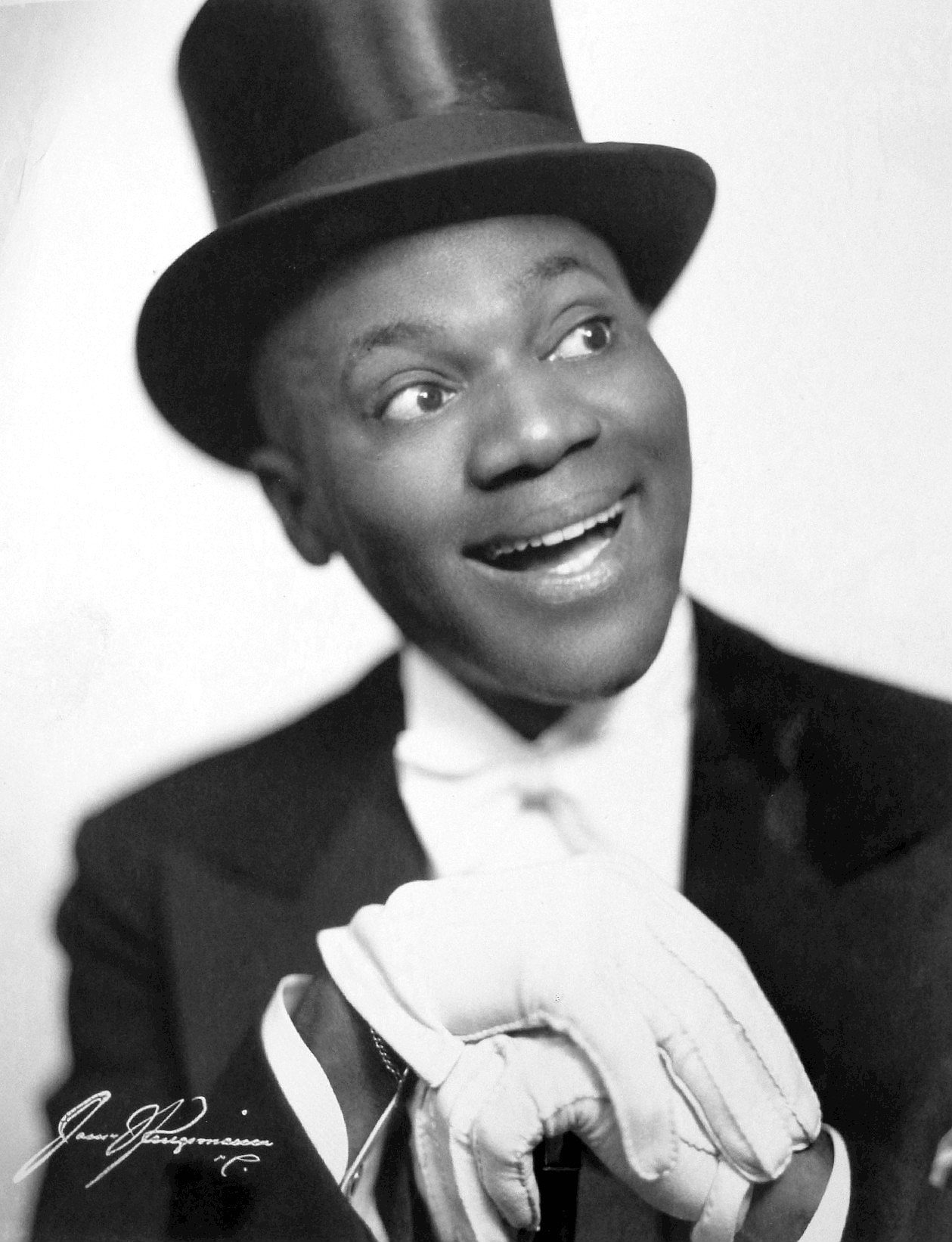
Bill Bojangles Robinson, 1942

The Hoofers Club was an African-American entertainment establishment and dancers' club hangout in Harlem, New York, that ran from the early 1920s until the early 1940s. It was founded and managed by Lonnie Hicks (1882–1953), an Atlanta-born ragtime pianist. (Note: The stride pianist Lucky Roberts credited Hicks, also a pianist, for influencing him to start a career in music. Hicks went on to become a songwriter and arranger for Nat King Cole.)

== History ==
The Hoofers Club was a legendary site of some of the best of jazz and tap performers, particularly in the 1920s and 1930s. It was located on Harlem's "Swing Street," the stretch of 133rd Street between Lenox and Seventh Avenues known for its music and dance venues.

The Hoofers Club was actually a small room in the back of a comedy club.

When you walked down the stairs of the Hoofers Club ... you would go into a little room. The room was no bigger than 30x20 feet. It had a piano in the corner and a good floor. All the dancers around town came in. You could hear dancing the minute you got in the building. There was always dancin' going on, known dancers and unknown dancers.

Among the tap dancers who appeared at the club were Bill Robinson, Jack Wiggins, Maceo Anderson, "Buddy" Bradley, John Bubbles, Honi Coles, Eddie Rector, Leonard Reed, Dewey Washington, Raymond Winfield, Roland Holder, Hal Leroy (one of the only White dancers ever invited in), Harold Mablin, "Sandman" Sims, "Slappy" Wallace, Warren Berry, "Baby" Laurence Jackson, Buster Brown, and other black tap dancing greats.

At the Hoofers Club, rookie and veteran, mostly [B]lack male tap dancers assembled to share with, steal from, and challenge each other; there, new standards were set for competition. These were nothing like the formalized buck-dancing competitions of Tammany Hall, where judges sat beside, before, and beneath the stage to evaluate the [dancers'] clarity, speed, and presentation. The Hoofers Club comprised a more informal panel of peers, whose judgments could be cruel and mocking and were driven by an insistence on innovation. "Survive or die" was the credo. In an eccentric fusion of imitation and innovation, young dancers were forced to find their style and rhythmic voice. It was said that on the wall of the Hoofers Club was written: "Thou shalt not copy each other's steps — Exactly."

== In popular culture ==
A fictionalized version of the Hoofers Club was depicted in Francis Ford Coppola's 1984 film The Cotton Club. The "Tree of Hope," a piece of which is still touched by performers for good luck on the stage of the Apollo Theater, originally stood outside the Hoofers Club and the nearby Lafayette Theatre.
