= Jack Wiggins =

American actor

Jack Wiggins was an African-American entertainer of the early twentieth century, now remembered primarily for his elegant style in tap dance. Wiggins worked as a performer at the Hoofers Club on "Swing Street" in Harlem, New York, where he inspired Laurence Donald "Baby Laurence" Jackson (later a member of the Tap Dance Hall of Fame). Wiggins also influenced Fayard and Harold Nicholas of the famous Nicholas Brothers tap duo. Wiggins was recognized as a master soloist in the "Class Act" style of tap dancing. A signature dance of Wiggins' was the "tango twist."

In a 1993 interview with The Los Angeles Times, Nipsey Russell remarked that he had been inspired to become a performer around the age of 10 while watching Wiggins on stage. "He came out immaculately attired in a well-dressed street suit and he tap-danced," Russell said. "As he danced, he told little jokes in between. He was so clean in his language and was lacking in any drawl, he just inspired me. I wanted to do that."
