= Paul Gangelin =

American screenwriter (1898–1961)

- Born: November 7, 1898; Milwaukee, Wisconsin, United States
- Died: September 25, 1961 (aged 62); Los Angeles, California, United States
- Occupation: Writer
- Years active: 1924–1960 (film & TV)

Paul Gangelin (November 7, 1898 – September 25, 1961) was an American screenwriter.

== Selected filmography ==
- Breed of the Border (1924)
- The No-Gun Man (1924)
- Forever After (1926)
- The Racketeer (1929)
- The Office Scandal (1929)
- The Black Mask (1935)
- Street Song (1935)
- Too Dangerous to Live (1939)
- Tarzan's Secret Treasure (1941)
- The Boogie Man Will Get You (1942)
- The Scarlet Claw (1944)
- A Sporting Chance (1945)
- The Daltons Ride Again (1945)
- Bells of San Angelo (1947)
- Under California Stars (1948)

== Bibliography ==
- Len D. Martin. The Republic Pictures Checklist: Features, Serials, Cartoons, Short Subjects and Training Films of Republic Pictures Corporation, 1935-1959. McFarland, 1998.
