= Evelyn Kaye =

American violinist (1911–1990)

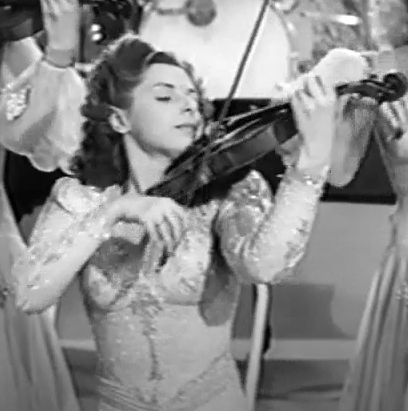
- Evelyn Kaye plays with the Hour of Charm Orchestra in this screen capture from Army-Navy Screen Magazine Number 22.

Background information
- Born: Evelyn Kaye Klein; October 19, 1911
- Died: July 8, 1990 Miami Beach, Florida
- Occupation: Musician
- Instrument: Violin
- Formerly of: Hour of Charm Orchestra

Evelyn Kaye Klein (1911–1990) was an American violinist, best known for her performances as "Evelyn and Her Magic Violin" with Phil Spitalny's Hour of Charm Orchestra.

== Early years ==
Born in the Yorkville neighborhood of New York City, Klein was the daughter of a German-Catholic father and a Hungarian-Jewish mother. As early as 1926, she was playing violin on radio stations WPCH and WJZ in New York City.

She graduated with honors from the Juilliard School, then known as the Institute of Musical Art, and she advanced her education in music as a fellowship student at the graduate school of the institute. She was awarded the Fontainebleau Grand Prix scholarship to study music in Paris, but she gave it up to pursue a professional career.

== Career ==
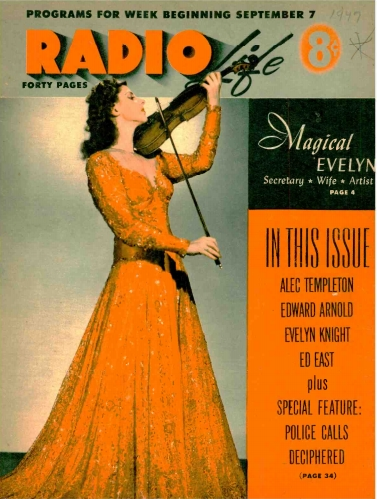
Evelyn Kaye as featured on the cover of Radio Life magazine's September 7, 1949, issue.

When Klein was 14 years old, she debuted at The Town Hall in New York City. Among the members of the audience was Spitalny, who at the time was conductor of the orchestra at the Capitol Theater. Although Kaye's grandmother slammed the door in Spitalny's face when he first tried to contact the girl about auditioning for him, she eventually auditioned for him, and he signed her to be the first member of his planned all-female orchestra.

Besides being concertmistress for the Hour of Charm Orchestra Evelyn Kaye was "responsible for settling dress, date, and temperament problems" for members of the group. She also arranged most of the group's orchestral and choral music.

In addition to her work with Spitalny's orchestra, Kaye performed as a solo artist, debuting at Carnegie Hall in 1937. In the mid-1940s, she became the first woman to perform as guest soloist with the Houston Symphony Orchestra.

== Personal life ==
On June 12, 1946, Kaye married Spitalny in Margate, New Jersey. The two collaborated as composers of songs, including "Save the Last Dance for Me" and "Pining for You".

Kaye and Spitalny settled in a retirement home in Miami Beach following an incident in Rochester, New York, when he collapsed on stage and was taken to the Mayo Clinic for treatment. After his death, she became active in cultural affairs in the Miami area, particularly as a member of the Greater Philharmonic Society's executive board.

== Death ==
On July 8, 1990, Kaye died of heart failure at Mount Sinai Medical Center in Miami Beach, Florida. She was 78.
