= Flash dance =

Form of tap dance

Flash dancing was a form of tap dance (tap was also called jazz dance at the time) that evolved in the 1920s–1930s, which combined dance with acrobatics. Prominent flash dance acts of the time include the Nicholas Brothers, The Four Step Brothers and the Berry Brothers.

Examples of such dance appeared in film predominantly between the 1920s and 1940s. The Nicholas Brothers' spectacular leap-frogging performance in the musical number "Jumpin' Jive" (with Cab Calloway and his orchestra) featured in the 1943 movie Stormy Weather has been praised as one of the greatest dance routines ever captured on film.
