= Phil Spitalny =

Ukrainian-American musician (1890–1970)

Background information
- Born: November 7, 1890, Tetiyev, Russian Empire (now Tetiiv, Ukraine)
- Died: October 11, 1970 (aged 79) Miami Beach, Florida, U.S.
- Genres: Jazz
- Occupations: Musician, bandleader, composer

Phil Spitalny (November 7, 1890 – October 11, 1970) was an Ashkenazi-born American musician, music critic, composer, and bandleader heard often on radio during the 1930s and 1940s. He rose to fame after he led an all-female orchestra, a novelty at the time.

== Early years ==
Spitalny was born into a Jewish family of musicians in Tetiyev, Russian Empire and later was a student at the Odessa Conservatory of Music. A child prodigy on clarinet, he toured Russia and came to the United States in 1905 or 1906.

== Orchestra ==
After playing with bands in Cleveland, Spitalny moved to Boston to direct the orchestra at a theater. Later, he returned to Cleveland, where he led his own orchestra, then went to New York to lead the orchestra at the Pennsylvania Hotel. For two years, he conducted the orchestra at the Stanley Theatre in Pittsburgh, Pennsylvania.

He led orchestras under the name Phil Spitalny and His All-Girl Orchestra, beginning with Hour of Charm Orchestra on his radio program The Hour of Charm in 1934. Spitalny and Evelyn Kaye Klein auditioned over one thousand women to fill the twenty-two piece orchestra. Klein was the featured performer, a virtuoso violinist introduced as Evelyn and her Magic Violin. The orchestra also featured acclaimed drummer Viola Smith. The radio program lasted for over ten years. Spitalny and Klein married in 1946.

The orchestra made a guest appearance in the Abbott and Costello movie Here Come the Co-Eds in 1945. Spitalny also appeared in When Johnny Comes Marching Home (1942) and on Ed Sullivan's television program Toast of the Town.

== Composing ==
Spitalny wrote music with Gus Kahn, jazz musician Lee “Stubby” Gordon His compositions include “Enchanted Forest”, “It's You, No One But You”, “Madelaine”, “Pining for You”, “Save the Last Dance for Me”, and “The Kiss I Can't Forget”.

== Last years and death ==
In retirement in Miami Beach, Spitalny was a music critic for a Miami newspaper. He died of cancer in Miami Beach in 1970 at the age of 79.

== Legacy ==
Spitalny has a Star on the Hollywood Walk of Fame.

== See also ==
- List of old-time American radio people
