= Hour of Charm Orchestra =

American musical group

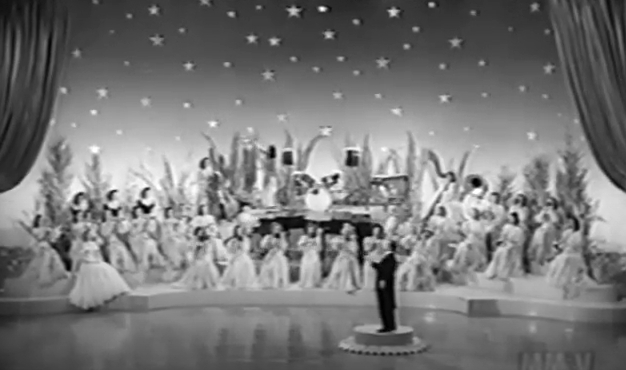
The Hour of Charm Orchestra as seen in a screen capture from Army-Navy Screen Magazine Number 22

The Hour of Charm Orchestra was an American musical group led by Phil Spitalny. Popular in the 1930s and 1940s, it was an all-female orchestra in an era when most orchestra members were male. The group was also known as Phil Spitalny's All-Girl Orchestra.

== Background ==
Inspired by witnessing a 1932 concert that featured "an electrifying performance by a brilliant female violinist," Spitalny disbanded a male orchestra that he directed and began a tour of the United States, seeking female musicians for a new orchestra. His expenditure of $40,000 and auditions of 1,500 women produced a 32-member orchestra that debuted at the Capitol Theatre in New York City in 1934. The musicians usually ranged in age from 17 to 30, and most were single.

A retrospective newspaper article about Spitalny published in 1958 noted "ridicule from all sides in show business and ... sour comments from his musician brothers that he was 'crazy'" as he created "the first all-girl band of any consequence ever organized."

== Style ==
The orchestra's specialty was music familiar to its audiences. In an article in the January 7, 1945, issue of Radio Life magazine, Spitalny described the group's style as "between symphonic and popular." Arrangements, which were done by three members of the orchestra, usually featured piano, harp, and strings more than saxophones, trombones, and trumpets. Sherrie Tucker, in her book, Swing Shift: “All-Girl” Bands of the 1940s, described "the orchestra's trademark effects of quivering strings, dramatic brass fanfares, galloping rhythms, and sweeping flurries from the harp."

Spitalny stressed class and decorum in the group's performances, in contrast to the "blatant sex appeal" of a contemporary all-female orchestra, Ina Ray Hutton's Melodears. He required the musicians to dress in formal evening gowns. The dresses, usually white, were uniform in design. The purchase of one lot of dresses in the mid-1940s cost $18,000.

== Personnel ==
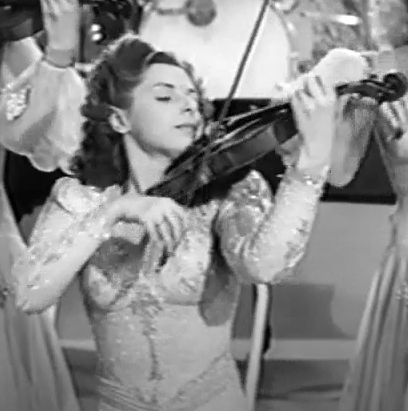
Evelyn Kaye plays with the Hour of Charm Orchestra in this screen capture from Army-Navy Screen Magazine Number 22.

Nearly all of the musicians were single, and their contracts required them to give six months' notice if they planned to marry. Most of them were graduates of conservatories. Versatility was a key element of the orchestra. Some members sang solos, and all of them formed a vocal chorus. Each was proficient on at least two instruments; one, Jan Baker, could play 12.

Evelyn Kaye, whom Spitalny met at the Juilliard School in New York, became the orchestra's first violinist and concertmistress. She joined him on the audition tour, seeking other members for the group. She was billed as "Evelyn and Her Magic Violin", with the violin being a Bergonzi. made in 1756 and given to her as an award from the Arts Club of America upon her graduation from Juilliard.

The core orchestra that played in the studio for radio broadcasts consisted of 45 women. On tour, however, Kaye noted in a 1978 interview, "we added 25 players because we needed a bigger sound for the auditoriums and halls where we played.".

Spitalny had a policy of billing the orchestra's members only by first name.

== Organization ==
The orchestra was set up as a stock company, with each member owning a number of shares of stock based on her role. At year's end, profits were distributed based on each person's shares in addition to their regular salaries. A five-woman committee governed the group, making decisions on matters such as whether or not members were allowed to go out on dates.

== Film ==
Spitalny and the musicians from The Hour of Charm appeared in two feature films. In When Johnny Comes Marching Home (1942), the group portrayed substitute musicians who filled in for male musicians who were abroad during World War II. In Here Come the Co-Eds (1945), the women portrayed residents of a girls' dormitory who played and sang music.

The group also made short subjects, mostly for Universal Pictures -- "more short subject films than any other all-girl band except for Ina Ray Hutton and her Melodears." The productions included Moments of Charm (1939), Musical Charmers (1936), Big City Fantasy (1934) and Phil Spitalny and His Musical Queens (1934).

== Critical reception ==
Paul Denis, in a review published in the October 25, 1941, issue of the trade publication Billboard, noted that the orchestra's performance at the Strand Theatre in New York, was "strong on fine melodious singing and instrumental music, but weak on comedy and surprise."

== Recognition ==
In 1937, the Radio Committee of the Women's National Exposition of Arts and Industries recognized the orchestra with its third annual Achievement Award for the most distinguished work of women in radio.
