= When Johnny Comes Marching Home (film) =

1942 film by Charles Lamont

- Directed by: Charles Lamont
- Written by: Dorothy Bennett; Oscar Brodney
- Produced by: Bernard W. Burton
- Starring: Allan Jones; Jane Frazee; Gloria Jean; Donald O'Connor; Peggy Ryan
- Cinematography: George Robinson
- Edited by: Charles Maynard
- Distributed by: Universal Pictures
- Release date: December 24, 1942
- Running time: 74 minutes
- Country: United States
- Language: English

When Johnny Comes Marching Home is a 1942 musical film directed by Charles Lamont and starring Allan Jones and Jane Frazee. The film is loosely based on the song with the same title.

== Plot ==
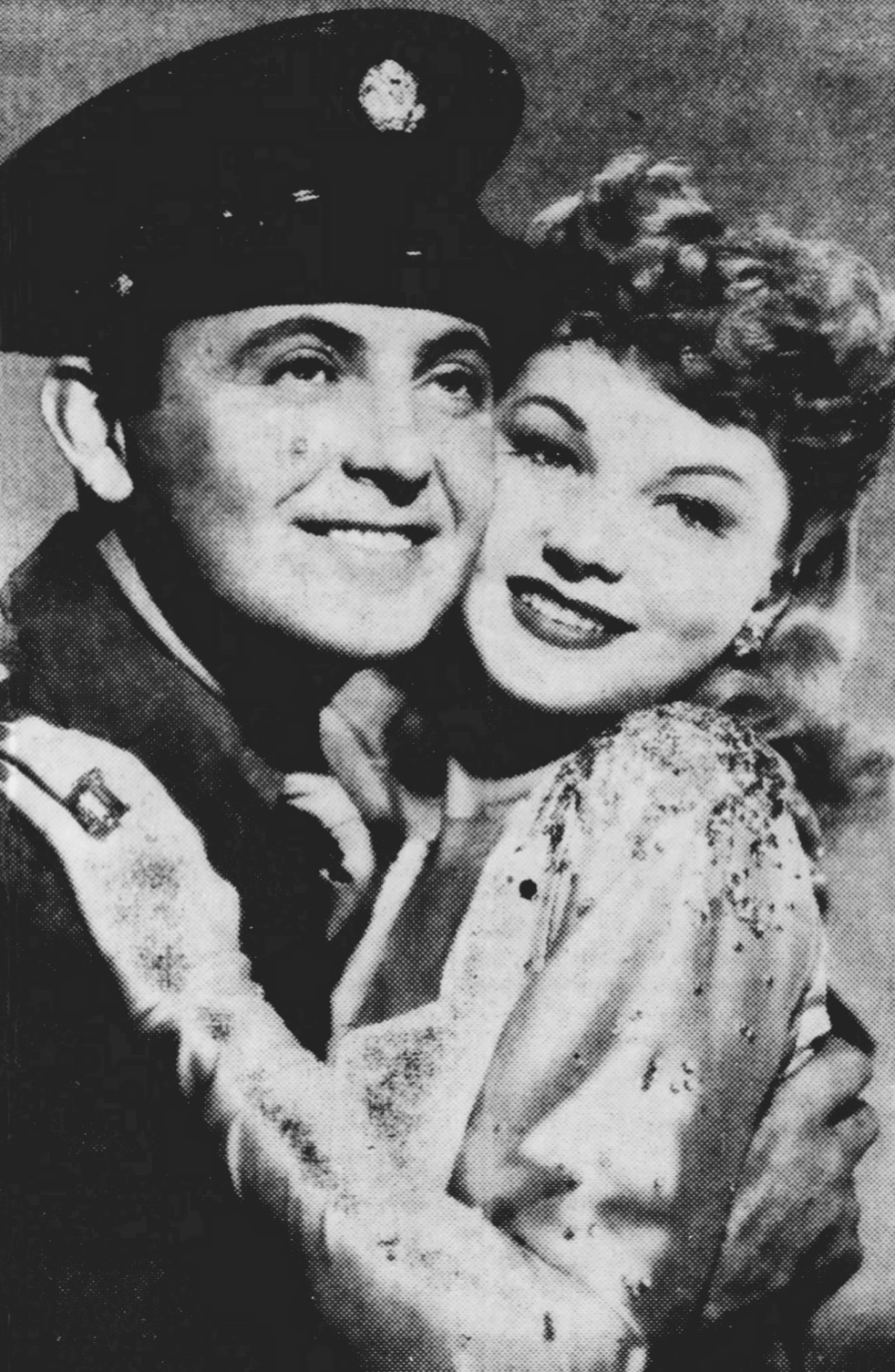
Allan Jones and Jane Frazee during the production, 1943

Johnny Kovacs (Jones) is a war hero who comes back home for a ten-day leave. Pursued by a woman (Shelton) who considers herself his fiancé, he works with his superior officers to hide during his leave. He adopts the name Johnny O'Rourke, and finds a room at a theatrical boarding house. He becomes friends with some other boarders (including O'Connor, Ryan and Gloria Jean) and falls in love with a woman (Frazee). His friends overhear him talking to his officer on the phone. They misinterpret the conversation and conclude that he is a deserter. They push him into giving himself up and returning to duty. Confused by their behavior at first, he figures out what they are up to, and plays along. It all works out in the end. The closing song in the picture is a rousing patriotic number sung directly to the audience by the main players in the film.

== Cast ==
- Allan Jones as Johnny Kovacs aka Johnny O'Rourke
- Jane Frazee as Joyce Benton
- Gloria Jean as Marilyn Benton
- Donald O'Connor as Frankie Flanagan
- Peggy Ryan as Dusty
- Richard Davies as Lt. Tommy Bridges
- Clyde Fillmore as Hamilton Wellman
- Marla Shelton as Diana Wellman
- Olin Howland as Trullers
- Emma Dunn as Ma (Norah) Flanagan
- The Four Step Brothers as themselves
- Phil Spitalny as himself

== Soundtrack ==
- One Of Us Has Gotta Go
  - Written by Inez James and Buddy Pepper
  - Sung by Gloria Jean, Peggy Ryan, and Donald O'Connor
- Romance
  - Written by Edgar Leslie and Walter Donaldson
  - Sung by Allan Jones and Gloria Jean
- Red Safarin
  - Performed by the Phil Spitalny All-Girl Orchestra with Evelyn and Her Magic Violin
- Jazz Etude
  - Performed by the Phil Spitalny All-Girl Orchestra with Evelyn and Her Magic Violin
- This Is It
  - Written by Don Raye and Gene de Paul
  - Sung by Allan Jones and Jane Frazee
- Green Eyes
  - Written by Adolfo Utera and Nilo Menendez
  - Sung by Gloria Jean
- This Is Worth Fighting For
  - Performed by the (credited) Phil Spitalny All-Girl Orchestra with Evelyn and Her Magic Violin
- You and the Night and Music
  - Written by Howard Dietz and Arthur Schwartz
  - Sung by Allan Jones, Jane Frazee, and Gloria Jean
- My Little Dream Girl
  - Written by A. Friedland and L. Wolfe Gilbert
  - Sung by Allan Jones
- Say It With Dancing
  - Written by Don Raye and Gene de Paul
  - Sung by Gloria Jean, Peggy Ryan, and Donald O'Connor
- We Must Be Vigilant
  - Written by Edgar Leslie and Joseph Burke
  - Performed by the Phil Spaltany All-Girl Orchestra with Evelyn and Her Magic Violin
- The Yanks Are Coming
  - Written by Harry Seymour
  - Performed by Allan Jones, Jane Frazee, Gloria Jean, Donald O'Connor, and Peggy Ryan with the Phil Spaltany All-Girl Orchestra

== Reception ==
The New York Times called Universal Pictures "miraculous" for "bringing this star-studded entertainment in under budget and within a 73-minute running time".
